The following is a list of popular Christmas songs recorded by various artists, many of which have hit on various charts, mostly in the United States (some only released in the artist's home country). The year indicates the original year of release for that artist's recorded version of the single or track, which may not necessarily be the first year the artist's version appeared on one or more popular music charts by various music trade publications. Many tracks were re-released as singles in subsequent years.


{| class="wikitable sortable" style="text-align: left;" width="auto"
|-
! scope="col" style="width: 15%" |Title
! scope="col" style="width: 15%" |Artist
! scope="col" style="width: 5%" |Year
! class="unsortable" scope="col" |Additional information
|-
| "A' Soalin'"
| Peter, Paul and Mary
| 1963
| Peaked at #15 on Billboard's Christmas Charts 12/28/1963.  From the album Moving. Written by Paul Stookey, Tracy Batteste & Elaina Mezzetti. Contains an element of "God Rest Ye Merry, Gentlemen".
|-
| rowspan=2|"Adeste Fideles(O Come, All Ye Faithful)"
| Associated Glee Clubs of America
| 1925
| Peaked at No. 5 on the Billboard pop singles chart in 1925. This historic record was the first electrically recorded disc to create a popular impact, and featured the largest choir popular music has ever known: some 4,800 voices (according to Columbia Records). Over 150 versions of this standard have appeared in Christmas LPs since 1946.
|-
| Bing Crosby
| 1942
| Peaked at No. 45 on the Billboard Hot 100 singles chart on the week ending December 26, 1960.
|-
| "All Alone on Christmas"
| Darlene Love
| 1992
| Peaked at No. 83 on the Billboard Hot 100 singles chart in 1993. From the 1992 film Home Alone 2: Lost in New York.
|-
| "All I Really Want for Christmas"
| Steven Curtis Chapman
| 2005
| Peaked at No. 2 on the Billboard Christian Songs chart in 2006. From the album All I Really Want for Christmas.
|-
| "All I Want for Christmas Is a Real Good Tan"
| Kenny Chesney
| 2003
| Peaked at No. 30 on Billboard's Hot Country Singles & Tracks chart. From the album All I Want for Christmas Is a Real Good Tan.
|-
| "All I Want for Christmas Is My Two Front Teeth"
| Spike Jones and his City Slickers
| 1948
| Spent three weeks at No. 1 on Billboard Records Most Played by Disk Jockeys chart in 1948 and 1949. Also peaked at No. 14 on Billboard Children's Records chart and No. 18 on Billboard Best-Selling Pop Singles chart in 1950. Written by Donald Yetter Gardner.
|-
| "All I Want for Christmas Is You" (1)
| Carla Thomas
| 1963
| Originally released as the B-side of Thomas's 1963 holiday hit, "Gee Whiz, It's Christmas". A new version recorded by Thomas peaked at No. 11 on Billboard Christmas Singles chart in 1966.
|-
| "All I Want for Christmas Is You" (2)
| Vince Vance & The Valiants
| 1989
| First released as a single in 1989, but didn't become a country radio chart hit until 1993. Re-charted in 1994–1997. Peaked at No. 31 on Billboard Hot Country Singles & Tracks chart in 1999. Melody is the same as Bobby Vinton's 1964 top 10 pop hit, "My Heart Belongs to Only You".
|-
| rowspan=5|"All I Want for Christmas Is You" (3)
| Mariah Carey
| 1994
| Peaked at No. 12 on Billboard Radio Songs chart and No. 6 on Billboard Adult Contemporary chart on the first week of January 1995, and three weeks at No. 1 on the Billboard Hot 100 chart in December 2019 into early January 2020. Written by Walter Afanasieff and Mariah Carey.
|-
| Lady Antebellum
| 2010
| Peaked at No. 38 on the Billboard Hot Country Songs chart on the week ending January 8, 2011. Also peaked at No. 24 on the Billboard Hot Christian Songs chart (week ending January 8, 2011) and at No. 14 on the Billboard Holiday Digital Song Sales chart (week ending November 10, 2012).
|-
| Newsboys
| 2010
| Peaked at No. 24 on the Billboard Hot Christian Songs chart on the week ending January 8, 2011.
|-
| Justin Bieber with Mariah Carey
| 2011
| Subtitled "SuperFestive!" Peaked at No. 3 on the Billboard Adult Contemporary chart on the week ending December 31, 2011. Also peaked at No. 86 on the main Billboard Hot 100 chart (week ending November 19, 2011), at No. 20 on the Billboard Holiday 100 chart (week ending December 17, 2011), at No. 51 on the Billboard Digital Song Sales chart (week ending November 19, 2011), at No. 1 on the Billboard Holiday Digital Song Sales chart (week ending November 19, 2011), and at No. 20 on the Billboard Holiday Streaming Songs chart (week ending December 14, 2013).
|-
| Michael Bublé
| 2011
| Peaked at No. 1 for five straight weeks on the Billboard Adult Contemporary chart, from the week ending December 10, 2011, to the week ending January 7, 2012. Also peaked at No. 99 on the main Billboard Hot 100 chart (week ending December 31, 2011), at No. 3 on the Billboard Holiday Digital Song Sales chart (week ending November 12, 2011), at No. 13 on the Billboard Holiday 100 chart (week ending December 29, 2012), at No. 21 on the Billboard Holiday Streaming Songs chart (week ending December 21, 2013), and at No. 35 on the Billboard Holiday Airplay chart (week ending December 31, 2011).
|- 
| "All My Love for Christmas"
| Lonestar
| 1998
| Peaked at No. 61 on Billboard Hot Country Singles & Tracks chart in 1999. From the 1998 various artists album Country Christmas Classics on RCA Records.
|-
| rowspan=2|"Amen"
| The Impressions
| 1964
| Featured in the 1963 film Lilies of the Field. Peaked at No. 7 on Billboard Hot 100 singles chart on the week ending January 9, 1965, and at No. 17 on Billboard Hot Rhythm & Blues Singles chart on the week ending January 30, 1965. An updated recording by the group titled "Amen (1970)" was released in November 1969, peaking at No. 44 on Billboard Best Selling Soul Singles chart on the week ending January 10, 1970, and at No. 110 on Billboard Bubbling Under The Hot 100 chart on the week ending January 3, 1970.
|-
| Lloyd Price and Erma Franklin
| 1964
| Peaked at No. 124 on Billboard Bubbling Under The Hot 100 chart on the week ending December 26, 1964.
|-
| "Angels Among Us"
| Alabama
| 1993
| Reached No. 51 on Billboard Hot Country Singles & Tracks chart from unsolicited airplay, as a partial Christmas single from the band's album Cheap Seats. Charted again in 1994 and 1995.
|-
| "Angels We Have Heard on High"
| Sonicflood
| 2003
| Traditional French carol known as Les Anges dans nos campagnes translated to English in 1862 by James Chadwick. Peaked at No. 21 on the Billboard Christian Songs chart in 2004. Chris Tomlin also had a hit version on the Christian Songs chart in 2006, peaking at No. 5.
|-
| "Another Lonely Christmas"
| Prince and The Revolution
| 1984
| Peaked at No. 5 on Billboard Christmas Singles chart. Originally released as the B-side of Prince and The Revolution's 1984 single "I Would Die 4 U".
|-
| "At This Table"
| Idina Menzel 
| 2019 
| From the album Christmas: A Season of Love.
|-
| rowspan=3|"Auld Lang Syne"
| Peerless Quartet
| 1921
| Peaked at No. 5 on one of the top-selling music charts in December 1921. Written by Robert Burns as a Scots-language poem in 1788 and set to the tune of a traditional folk song (Roud no. 6294).
|-
| Guy Lombardo and His Royal Canadians
| 1939 
| First recorded and released by Decca Records in 1939 (Decca 2478) and again in 1947 (Decca 24260). A Decca re-release charted on the Music Vendor Christmas list of 1963. Lombardo first performed the song on radio in 1929.
|-
| Kenny G
| 1999
| Subtitled "The Millennium Mix". Peaked at No. 7 on Billboard Hot 100 singles chart on the week ending January 8, 2000.
|-
| rowspan=3|"Away in a Manger"
| Reba McEntire
| 1987
| Peaked at No. 73 on Billboard Hot Country Singles & Tracks chart on the week ending January 9, 1999. From her 1987 holiday album Merry Christmas to You.
|-
| Kenny Chesney
| 1998
| Peaked at No. 67 on Billboard Hot Country Singles & Tracks chart on the week ending January 8, 2000.
|-
| Casting Crowns
| 2005
| Peaked at No. 7 on Billboard Hot Christian Songs chart on the week ending January 7, 2006.
|-
| "Babes in Toyland/March of the Toys"
| Tommy Dorsey Orchestra
| 1939
| Written by Victor Herbert and Glen MacDonough. Popular by Arthur Fiedler and the Boston Pops orchestra (1958). Later recorded by Doc Severinsen and the Tonight Show Orchestra (1991).
|-
| "A Baby Changes Everything"
| Faith Hill
| 2008
| Spent three weeks at No. 1 on Billboard's Hot Adult Contemporary Tracks chart. From Hill's first Christmas album, Joy to the World.
|-
| rowspan=10|"Baby, It's Cold Outside"
| Dinah Shore & Buddy Clark
| 1949
| With orchestra under the direction of Ted Dale. Written in 1944 by Frank Loesser. From the 1949 film Neptune's Daughter starring Esther Williams and Red Skelton. Peaked at No. 3 on the Billboard Records Most Played By Disk Jockeys chart, at No. 4 on the Billboard Best-Selling Popular Retail Records chart, and at No. 6 on the Billboard Most-Played Juke Box Records chart in mid 1949.
|-
|  Margaret Whiting & Johnny Mercer
| 1949
| With Paul Weston and his orchestra. Peaked at No. 3 on the Billboard Records Most Played By Disk Jockeys chart, at No. 4 on the Billboard Best-Selling Popular Retail Records chart, and at No. 8 on the Billboard Most-Played Juke Box Records chart in mid 1949.
|-
| Ella Fitzgerald & Louis Jordan & His Tympany Five
| 1949
| Peaked at No. 9 on the Billboard Most-Played Juke Box Records chart and at No. 17 on the Billboard Best-Selling Popular Retail Records chart in mid 1949.
|-
| Don Cornell & Laura Leslie 
| 1949
| With Sammy Kaye and his orchestra. Peaked at No. 12 on the Billboard Records Most Played By Disk Jockeys chart, at No. 13 on the Billboard Best-Selling Popular Retail Records chart, and at No. 17 on the Billboard Most-Played Juke Box Records chart in mid 1949.
|-
| Homer & Jethro with June Carter
| 1949
| Peaked at No. 22 on the Billboard Records Most Played By Disk Jockeys chart on the week ending August 20, 1949.
|-
| Dean Martin
| 1959
| From Martin's 1959 album A Winter Romance (with orchestra conducted by Gus Levene). Reached No. 1 on the Billboard Holiday Digital Song Sales chart on the week ending October 29, 2011. Also peaked at No. 17 on the Billboard Holiday 100 chart and at No. 15 on the Billboard Holiday Streaming Songs chart on the week ending December 22, 2018. First entered the Billboard Hot 100 chart at No. 45 on the week ending January 4, 2020.
|-
| Ray Charles & Betty Carter
| 1962
| With orchestra conducted by Marty Paich. Peaked at No. 91 on the Billboard Hot 100 chart on the week ending March 10, 1962.
|-
| Lady Antebellum
| 2008
| Peaked at No. 26 on the Billboard Holiday 100 chart on the week ending December 31, 2011, and at No. 6 on the Billboard Holiday Digital Song Sales chart on the week ending November 26, 2011.
|-
| Glee Cast featuring Chris Colfer and Darren Criss
| 2010
| Peaked at No. 57 on the Billboard Hot 100 chart on the week ending December 25, 2010. Performed in the 2010 Glee episode "A Very Glee Christmas."
|-
| Idina Menzel and Michael Buble 
| 2014
| Spent three weeks at No. 1 on the Billboard Adult Contemporary chart from mid December 2014 into early January 2015. Also peaked at No. 14 on the Billboard Holiday 100 chart on the week ending December 13, 2014, and at 78 on the Billboard Hot 100 chart on the week ending December 6, 2014.
|-
| "Baby Jesus Is Born"
| Garth Brooks
| 1999
| Peaked at No. 62 on the Billboard Hot Country Singles & Tracks chart.
|-
| "Baby's First Christmas"
| Connie Francis
| 1961
| Featuring the Don Costa Orchestra. Peaked at No. 7 on Billboard Middle-Road Singles chart and No. 24 on the Billboard Hot 100 singles chart in 1961, and at No. 13 on Billboard Christmas Singles chart in 1965. 
|-
| "Back Door Santa"
| Clarence Carter
| 1968
| Released on the 1968 various artists holiday soul album Soul Christmas. Also recorded by Bon Jovi for the 1987 various artists holiday compilation A Very Special Christmas (though it was removed from later pressings), and sampled by Run-D.M.C. for their hit, "Christmas in Hollis" (which was also included on A Very Special Christmas).
|-
| "Barefoot Santa Claus"
| Sonny James (The Southern Gentleman)
| 1966
| Peaked at No. 9 on Billboard Christmas Singles chart. Charted again in 1968. Features a children's chorus on backing vocals. From the album My Christmas Dream.
|-
| "Because It's Christmas (For All the Children)"
| Barry Manilow
| 1990
| Peaked at No. 38 on the Billboard Hot Adult Contemporary Tracks chart in 1991. From Manilow's first Christmas album, Because It's Christmas.
|-
| "Believe"
| Josh Groban
| 2004
| Peaked at No. 1 for five weeks on the Billboard Hot Adult Contemporary Tracks chart, and "Bubbled under" the Billboard Hot 100 chart with a peak position of #112. From the 2004 film The Polar Express.
|-
| "The Bell That Couldn't Jingle"
| Bobby Vinton
| 1964
| Written by Burt Bacharach and Larry Kusik. Paul Evans, Bobby Helms, Herb Alpert, Anita Kerr, and Bacharach each recorded the song as well, but only Vinton's version charted, reaching No. 23 on the Billboard Christmas Singles chart.
|-
| "Belleau Wood"
| Garth Brooks
| 1997
| Peaked at No. 41 on Billboard Hot Country Singles & Tracks chart in 1998. From Brooks's album Sevens.
|-
| "The Bells of St. Mary's"
| Bing Crosby
| 1945
| Written by A. Emmett Adams and Douglas Furber in 1917. While the song has no lyrical relation to Christmas, its inclusion in the 1945 film of the same name has made it a popular choice for various artists' holiday albums.
|-
| "Better Days"
| Goo Goo Dolls
| 2006
| Despite its overtly Christian tone and obvious references to Christmas, this song managed to reach No. 3 on the Billboard Hot Adult Top 40 Tracks chart, and remains in regular rotation on hot adult top 40 stations.
|-
| "The Blessings"
| Alabama
| 1996
| Peaked at No. 72 on the Billboard Hot Country Singles & Tracks chart in 1997.
|-
| rowspan=9|"Blue Christmas"
| Ernest Tubb
| 1949
| Peaked at No. 1 on Billboard Most-Played Juke Box (Country & Western) Records chart in the issue dated January 7, 1950. Also made these other Billboard music charts in December 1949 (with peak positions shown): Best-Selling Retail Folk (Country & Western) Records (No. 2), Country & Western Records Most Played by Folk Disk Jockeys (No. 2), Records Most Played by Disk Jockeys (No. 23), and Most Played Juke Box Records (No. 26). Written as a country song by Billy Hayes and Jay W. Johnson in 1948, and first recorded by Doye O'Dell that year. Ranks as the all-time number one holiday single on Billboard Hot Country Songs chart.
|-
| Hugo Winterhalter and His Orchestra
| 1949
| Peaked at No. 9 on Billboard Records Most Played by Disk Jockeys chart in the issue dated January 7, 1950. Also made these other Billboard music charts in December 1949 (with peak positions shown): Most-Played Juke Box Records (No. 18) and Best Selling Pop Singles (No. 21). Re-entered Billboard Most Played by Disk Jockeys chart in December 1950, peaking at No. 20.
|-
| Russ Morgan and His Orchestra
| 1949
| Made these Billboard music charts in December 1949 (with peak positions shown): Best Selling Pop Singles (No. 11), Most-Played Juke Box Records (No. 13), and Records Most Played by Disk Jockeys (No. 18). Vocals by Russ Morgan and The Morganaires.
|-
| Elvis Presley
| 1957
| From the album Elvis' Christmas Album. First released as a commercial single in 1964. Listed on Billboard Christmas Singles chart each December from 1964 to 1970, as well as 1972, 1973, and then again from 1983 to 1985, peaking at No. 1 on this chart on the week ending December 5, 1964, and then again on the week ending December 22, 1973. First entered Billboard main Hot 100 chart at No. 40 on the week ending January 5, 2019, peaking at No. 24 on the week ending January 7, 2023 (following its third chart re-entry). Also made these other Billboard music charts (with peak positions shown): Country Airplay (No. 55), Country Digital Song Sales (No. 22), Country Streaming Songs (No. 4), Digital Song Sales (No. 47), Global 200 (No. 35), Global 200 Excl. US (No. 89), Greatest of All Time Holiday 100 Songs (No. 18), Holiday 100 (No. 12), Holiday Airplay (No. 9), Holiday Digital Song Sales (No. 8), Holiday Streaming Songs (No. 9), Hot 100 Recurrents (No. 3), Hot Country Songs (No. 55), LyricFind Global (No. 13), LyricFind US (No. 15), Rock Digital Song Sales (No. 5), Rock Streaming Songs (No. 1), and Streaming Songs (No. 19).
|-
| The Browns featuring Jim Edward Brown
| 1960
| Charted one week on Billboard Hot 100 chart at No. 97 (week ending December 19, 1960). Features a guitar solo by Chet Atkins.
|-
| Vince Gill
| 1998
| Charted one week on Billboard Hot Country Singles & Tracks chart at No. 74 (week ending January 9, 1999).
|-
| Clay Walker
| 2000
| Peaked at No. 51 on Billboard Hot Country Singles & Tracks chart (week ending January 13, 2001).
|-
| Harry Connick, Jr.
| 2003
| Charted one week on Billboard Adult Contemporary chart at No. 21 (week ending January 3, 2004).
|-
| Elvis Presley with Martina McBride
| 2008
| Virtual duet featuring Presley's archived vocals mixed with McBride's vocals and re-recorded instrumentation. Made these Billboard music charts (with peak positions shown): Adult Contemporary (No. 22), Country Airplay (No. 36), and Hot Country Songs (No. 36).
|-
| "Blue December"
| Hugo Winterhalter and his Orchestra
| 1951
| Peaked at No. 18 on Billboard Records Most Played by Disk Jockeys chart in early 1952.
|-
| "Blue Holiday"
| The Shirelles
| 1961
| Written by Willie Denson and Luther Dixon and recorded by The Shirelles in 1961. Later recorded by Aretha Franklin, and appeared in the 2002 film The Santa Clause 2.
|-
|-
| "Blue Lonely Winter"
| Jimmy Newman
| 1967
| Peaked at No. 11 on Billboard Hot Country Singles chart in 1968.
|-
| "Blue Winter"
| Connie Francis
| 1964
| Peaked at No. 24 on the Billboard Hot 100 singles chart and No. 7 on the Billboard Middle-Road Singles chart in March 1964.
|-
| "Boogie Woogie Santa Claus"
| Mabel Scott
| 1948
| Peaked at No. 12 on Billboard Race Records chart. Written by Leon René. Other versions recorded by Patti Page (1950), Inner Voices (1994), Dave Koz (2001), the Brian Setzer Orchestra (2002) and Brenda Russell (2003).
|-
| "Breath of Heaven (Mary's Song)"
| Amy Grant
| 1992
| From the album Home For Christmas.
|-
| "Call Me Claus"
| Garth Brooks
| 2001
| Peaked at No. 22 on the Billboard Hot 100 sales chart in October 2001, and later reached No. 55 on the Hot Country Singles & Tracks chart in 2002. Title song from the TV movie starring Whoopi Goldberg.
|-
| "Candy Cane Children"
| The White Stripes
| 2002
|
|-
| "Candy Cane Christmas"
| Darius Rucker
| 2009
| Peaked at No. 16 on the Billboard Adult Contemporary chart, and No. 32 on the Country chart in 2010. Originally released on the various-artists CD Now That's What I Call Christmas! 4 in 2010, and later on Rucker's 2014 album Home for the Holidays.
|-
| rowspan=7| "Carol of the Bells"
| 
| 1942
| Mykola Leontovych adapted the music from the Ukrainian song "Shchedryk" in 1914.  Peter Wilhousky rearranged the melody for orchestra and added lyrics he copywrote in 1936.  The song was first made commercially available in a medley on Fred Waring And His Pennsylvanians' 1942 album  'Twas The Night Before Christmas Straight No Chaser's version from their 2008 album Holiday Spirits charted Billboard's Holiday Digital Song Sales survey in 2010.  A version by Kim Walker-Smith peaked at No. 13 on Billboard Adult Contemporary chart in 2014. 
|-
|  and the Ray Conniff Singers
| 1962
| Featured on his popular album We Wish You a Merry Christmas titled as "Ring Christmas Bells".  His version peaked at #60 on Billboard's Holiday 100 in 2015.
|-
| Mannheim Steamroller
| 1988
|  Mannheim Steamroller recorded a prog-rock version on their second Christmas studio album A Fresh Aire Christmas.  Their version peaked at #44 on Billboard's Holiday Songs chart in 2010. 
|-
| 
| 1990
|Composer John Williams conducted a version for the Home Alone: Original Motion Picture Soundtrack. His version charted at number 86 on Billboard's Greatest of All Time Holiday 100 chart's.  It peaked at #47 on the Holiday 100 in 2017.
|-
| 
| 1993
|The first track on The Christmas Album has charted the highest on the Holiday 100 at #33 in 2008.  
|-
| 
| 1997
| Peaked at No. 20 on Billboard's Hot Adult Contemporary Tracks chart in 1998. 
|-
|Pentatonix
| 2008
|Featured on their popular album That's Christmas to Me, their A cappella version peaked at #5 in 2013 on Billboard's Holiday Digital Song Sales chart.
|-
| "Caroling, Caroling"
| Nat King Cole
| 1960
| Written by Alfred Burt & Wihla Hutson. Also recorded by Natalie Cole, Tennessee Ernie Ford, and the King Family.
|-
| "Celebrate Me Home"
| Kenny Loggins
| 1977
| Title track of Loggins' 1977 debut solo album. Released as a single, the studio version reached No. 64 on the US Record World pop chart in the spring of 1978. A 2015 version by LeAnn Rimes featuring Gavin DeGraw peaked at No. 12 on the Billboard Adult Contemporary chart in 2015.
|-
| "Cherry Cherry Christmas"
| Neil Diamond
| 2009
| Peaked at No. 4 on Billboard Adult Contemporary chart. First single released from and title track on Diamond's third holiday album, A Cherry Cherry Christmas.
|-
| "Child of God"
| Bobby Darin
| 1960
| Peaked at No. 95 on the Billboard Hot 100 singles chart. B-side of Darin's hit single "Christmas Auld Lang Syne".
|-
| "Child of Winter"
| The Beach Boys
| 1974
|
|-
| "Children, Go Where I Send Thee"
| Kenny Rogers featuring Home Free
| 2015
| Peaked at No. 21 on Billboard Hot Christian Songs chart in 2016. Another version by John Oates peaked at No. 29 on Billboard Adult Contemporary chart in 2017.
|-
| "Children's Christmas Song"
| The Supremes
| 1965
| Peaked at No. 7 on Billboard's Christmas Singles chart 12/11/1965. Features a children's chorus on backing vocals.
|-
| "The Chipmunk Song (Christmas Don't Be Late)"
| The Chipmunks
| 1958
| Spent four weeks at No. 1 on the Billboard Hot 100 singles chart in 1958, and reached No. 5 on Billboard Hot R&B Sides chart in 1959. Written by Ross Bagdasarian (a.k.a. David Seville). The most popular novelty Christmas single in the U.S. through the 1960s. Launched a 50-year music career for the fictional character group.
|-
| "C-H-R-I-S-T-M-A-S"
| Eddy Arnold, the Tennessee Plowboy and his Guitar
| 1949
| Peaked at No. 7 on Billboard Country & Western Records Most Played by Folk Disk Jockeys charts. Written by Eddy Arnold & Jenny Lou Carson. Also recorded by the Ames Brothers and Jim Reeves.
|-
| "Christmas Ain't Christmas (Without the One You Love)"
| The O'Jays
| 1969
| Written and produced by Kenny Gamble and Leon Huff. The song's original title was the longer "(Christmas Ain't Christmas New Year's Ain't New Year's) Without the One You Love". Reissued by the group's record label (Philly International) in 1973 following the group's huge success.
|-
| "Christmas All Over Again"
| Tom Petty and the Heartbreakers
| 1992
| From the 1992 album A Very Special Christmas 2. Subsequently featured later that year in the 1992 film Home Alone 2: Lost in New York.
|-
| "Christmas Alphabet"
| The McGuire Sisters
| 1954
| Peaked at No. 25 on the popular records chart. Features orchestration by Dick Jacobs.
|-
| "Christmas at Ground Zero"
| "Weird Al" Yankovic
| 1986
|
|-
| "Christmas at K-Mart"
| Root Boy Slim
| 1978
|
|-
| "Christmas at the Zoo"
| The Flaming Lips
| 1995
| From the album Clouds Taste Metallic. Not intended to be a Christmas song, though the characteristic "jingling bells" are featured in the song, as well as talk of the holiday.
|-
| "Christmas Auld Lang Syne"
| Bobby Darin
| 1960
| Peaked at No. 51 on the Billboard Hot 100 singles chart in 1961. The B-side "Child of God" also charted for one week in 1960.
|-
| rowspan=3|"Christmas (Baby Please Come Home)"
| Darlene Love
| 1963
| Included on the 1963 holiday album A Christmas Gift for You from Phil Spector. Written by Phil Spector, Ellie Greenwich, and Jeff Barry. First entered Billboard Hot 100 chart on the week ending December 29, 2018, peaking at No. 15 on the week ending December 31, 2022 (following its fourth chart re-entry). Also made these other Billboard music charts (with peak positions shown): Global 200 (No. 22), Global 200 Excl. US (No. 52), Greatest of All Time Holiday 100 Songs (No. 31), Holiday 100 (No. 7), Holiday Airplay (No. 24), Holiday Digital Song Sales (No. 21), Holiday Streaming Songs (No. 6), Hot 100 Recurrents (No. 1), R&B Digital Song Sales (No. 6), R&B Streaming Songs (No. 1), R&B/Hip-Hop Digital Song Sales (No. 12), R&B/Hip-Hop Streaming Songs (No. 1), and Streaming Songs (No. 8).
|-
| U2
| 1987
| Released on the 1987 charity album A Very Special Christmas. Peaked at No. 45 on the Billboard Digital Song Sales chart on the week ending January 1, 2005, at No. 29 on the Billboard Rock Digital Song Sales chart on the week ending December 25, 2010, and at No. 30 on the Billboard Holiday Digital Song Sales chart on the week ending January 8, 2011.
|-
| Mariah Carey
| 1994
| Peaked at No. 20 on the Billboard Holiday 100 chart and at No. 27 on the Billboard Holiday Airplay chart on the week ending December 29, 2012, at No. 12 on the Billboard Holiday Digital Song Sales chart on the week ending November 26, 2011, and at No. 15 on the Billboard Holiday Streaming Songs chart on the week ending December 28, 2013.
|-
| "Christmas Blues"
| Canned Heat
| 1968
| Peaked at No. 18 on the Billboard Christmas Singles chart. Also released as a single by The Chipmunks.
|-
| "The Christmas Blues"
| Dean Martin
| 1953
| Written by David Holt and Sammy Cahn. Also recorded by Jo Stafford.
|-
| "Christmas Canon"
| Trans-Siberian Orchestra
| 1998
| Chord progression is based on that of Pachelbel's Canon in D major.
|-
| "Christmas Can't Be Far Away"
| Eddy Arnold and his Guitar
| 1954
| Peaked at No. 12 on Billboard Country & Western Records Most Played by Jockeys chart in 1955.
|-
| "Christmas Can't Be Very Far Away"
| Amy Grant
| 1999
| Not to be confused with "Christmas Can't Be Far Away" by Eddy Arnold.
|-
| "Christmas Carol"
| Skip Ewing
| 1990
| Written in 1986 and first released on Ewing's 1990 album Following Yonder Star. First charted on Billboard Hot Country Singles & Tracks chart in 1996, peaking at No. 68.
|-
| "Christmas Carols by the Old Corral"
| Tex Ritter
| 1945
| Peaked at No. 2 on Billboard Most-Played Juke Box Folk Records chart.
|-
| "Christmas Celebration"
| B. B. King
| 1963
| First charted on Billboard Christmas Singles chart in 1964, peaking at No. 25. Charted again in 1967, peaking at No. 17.
|-
| "Christmas Children"
| David Collings, Richard Beaumont, & Karen Scargill
| 1970
| From the 1970 children's holiday motion picture based on A Christmas Carol by Charles Dickens Scrooge. Featured in the soundtrack composed by Leslie Bricusse. 
|-
| "Christmas C'mon"
| Lindsey Stirling featuring Becky G
| 2017
| Peaked at No. 21 on the Billboard Adult Contemporary chart.
|-
| "Christmas (Comes But Once a Year)"
| Amos Milburn
| 1960
| Originally released as the B-side of Charles Brown's 1960 holiday hit single, "Please Come Home for Christmas".
|-
| "Christmas Cookies"
| George Strait
| 2001
| From the 2001 various artists album Christmas Cookies. Peaked at No. 33 on Billboard Hot Country Singles & Tracks chart in 2002. Originally issued on the Target CD A Country Christmas 1999.
|-
| "Christmas Day"
| Eddie Fisher
| 1952
| Peaked at No. 22 on the popular records chart. Features Hugo Winterhalter and his orchestra. Written by Benny Davis and Ted Murry. Released within a four-record album set titled Christmas with Eddie Fisher.
|-
| "Christmas Dinner"
| Tennessee Ernie Ford
| 1951
| B-side is "A Rootin' Tootin' Santa Claus".
|-
| "Christmas Dragnet (Parts I & II)"
| Stan Freberg with Daws Butler
| 1953
| Peaked at No. 13 on Billboard Best Selling Singles chart. A parody of Dragnet and the follow-up to Freberg's No. 1 hit from several months earlier, "St. George and the Dragonet". In 1954, the same record was re-issued under the title "Yulenet (Parts I & II)".
|-
| "Christmas Dream"
| Perry Como
| 1974
| Peaked at No. 92 on the Billboard Hot 100 singles chart. From the 1974 film The Odessa File. Como's last appearance on the Billboard Hot 100.
|-
| "Christmas Dreaming (A Little Early This Year)"
| Frank Sinatra
| 1947
| Peaked at No. 26 on the Billboard Pop Charts. Featuring the Axel Stordahl orchestra.
|-
| "Christmas Eve"
| Kelly Clarkson
| 2017
| Peaked at No. 2 on the Billboard Adult Contemporary chart in early 2018.
|-
| "Christmas Eve in My Hometown"
| Bobby Vinton
| 1970
| Earlier recordings by Eddie Fisher and Kate Smith.
|-
| "Christmas Eve/Sarajevo 12/24"
| Savatage
| 1996
| The song is a medley including "God Rest Ye Merry, Gentlemen" and a hard rock version of "Carol of the Bells". First released in 1995 on the Savatage album Dead Winter Dead, but the same recording was re-released in 1996 as a track on the Trans-Siberian Orchestra album Christmas Eve and Other Stories.
|-
| "A Christmas Festival (Part One)"
| Leroy Anderson and His "Pops" Concert Orchestra
| 1952
| Peaked at No. 22 on the pop singles chart on the week of January 3, 1953. Famous medley of nine songs arranged by Anderson: "Joy to the World"/"Deck the Halls"/"God Rest Ye Merry, Gentlemen"/"Good King Wenceslas"/"Hark! The Herald Angels Sing"/"The First Noel"/"Silent Night"/"Jingle Bells"/O Come, All Ye Faithful".
|-
| "Christmas for Cowboys"
| John Denver
| 1975
| From the album Rocky Mountain Christmas. Written by Steve Weisberg. Peaked at No. 58 on the Billboard Hot 100 chart.
|-
| "Christmas Goose (Snowbird)"
| Stan & Doug 'Yust Go Nuts at Christmas'
| 1970
| Peaked at No. 7 on Billboard Christmas Singles chart on the week ending December 26, 1970.
|-
| "Christmas in America"
| Pat Benatar
| 2001
| Reached No. 22 on the Billboard Adult Contemporary chart and No. 37 on the Billboard Hot 100. Later appeared on the 2003 album Go as a hidden track. 
|-
| "Christmas in Dixie"
| Alabama
| 1982
| The original version featured Alabama wishing you "Merry Christmas" near the end of the song. Lead singer Randy Owen re-recorded the song with Kenny Chesney in 2003.
|-
| "Christmas in Hollis"
| Run-D.M.C.
| 1987
| An original song written and recorded by the group for charity, with the music video a perennial favorite on the MTV through the late 1980s and 1990s. It first appeared on two 1987 various artist holiday compilation albums: A Very Special Christmas and Christmas Rap, with the former album to benefit the Special Olympics. The track samples the 1968 soul tune "Back Door Santa" by Clarence Carter.
|-
| "Christmas in Killarney"
| Dennis Day
| 1950
| Featuring the Mellowmen on backing vocals and instrumentation by the Henri René Orchestra. Another hit version was by Percy Faith and the Shillelagh Singers in 1950. Also recorded on successful Christmas albums by Bing Crosby, Bobby Vinton and Anne Murray.
|-
| "Christmas in My Hometown"
| Sonny James
| 1954
| Covered by Travis Tritt in 1992
|-
| "Christmas in My Home Town"
| Charley Pride
| 1970
| Peaked at No. 11 on the Billboard Christmas Singles chart.
|-
| "Christmas in New Orleans"
| Louis Armstrong with the Benny Carter Orchestra
| 1955
|
|-
| "Christmas in the Caribbean"
| Jimmy Buffett
| 1985
|
|-
| "Christmas in the City"
| Elizabeth Chan
| 2014
| Peaked at No. 29 on the Billboard Adult Contemporary chart in 2015.
|-
| "Christmas in Your Arms"
| Steve Wariner
| 2000
| Peaked at No. 65 on the Billboard Hot Country Songs chart.
|-
| "Christmas Is" (1)
| Percy Faith
| 1966
| Written by Percy Faith and Spencer Maxwell. Originally recorded by Percy Faith in 1964 as an instrumental ("Judy"). Selected as the theme song for the 1967 Christmas Seals appeal. Also a hit that year for Lou Rawls.
|-
| "Christmas Is" (2)
| Jim Brickman featuring Mark Masri
| 2008
| Peaked at No. 18 on the Billboard Hot Adult Contemporary Tracks chart during the Christmas season of 2008.
|-
| "Christmas Is for Children"
| 
| 1968
| Written by Sammy Cahn and Jimmy Van Heusen, with orchestration by Al De Lory. Peaked at No. 7 on Billboard Christmas Singles survey on the week ending December 21, 1968.
|-
| "Christmas Is Going to the Dogs"
| Eels
| 2000
| From the 2000 film How the Grinch Stole Christmas.
|-
| "Christmas Is Just a Song for Us This Year"
| Louise Mandrell and R.C. Bannon
| 1982
| B-side of "Christmas in Dixie" by Alabama. Reached No. 35 on the Hot Country Singles chart in 1982.
|-
| "Christmas Is Just Around the Corner"
| Barry Manilow
| 2008
| Reached No. 16 on the Billboard Hot Adult Contemporary Tracks chart.
|-
| "Christmas Is Now Drawing Near at Hand"
| Steve Winwood
| 1997
| From the album A Very Special Christmas 3.
|-
| "Christmas is the Time to Say 'I Love You'"
| Billy Squier
| 1981
| Originally released as the B-side of Squier's 1981 single "My Kinda Lover".  Peaked at #9 on Billboard's Christmas chart 12/15/1984. 
|-
| "Christmas Island"
| The Andrews Sisters with Guy Lombardo and His Royal Canadians
| 1946
| Peaked at No. 7 on the Billboard Pop charts in 1946. Re-charted in 1947 and 1949. Also a hit for Jimmy Buffett (1996), and The Brian Setzer Orchestra (2005).
|-
| "Christmas Kisses"
| The Bookends 
| 1961
| With the Ray Anthony orchestra.
|-
| "Christmas Lights"
| Coldplay
| 2010
| Digital download track that peaked at No. 25 on the Billboard Hot 100 and No. 12 on the Billboard Hot Digital Songs chart.
|-
| "A Christmas Love"
| Johnny Kaye with the Morty Jay Orchestra
| 1963
| Charted for 1 week on the Christmas Singles chart, peaking at No. 20.
|-
| "Christmas Lullaby"
| Cary Grant
| 1967
| Written by Peggy Lee and Cy Coleman.
|-
| "Christmas Medley" (1)
| Liberace
| 1953
| Peaked at No. 21 on the pop singles chart on the week of December 26, 1953. Medley of four songs: "White Christmas"/"Jingle Bells"/"O Come, All Ye Faithful (Adeste Fideles)"/"Silent Night, Holy Night".
|-
| "Christmas Medley" (2)
| The Salsoul Orchestra
| 1976
| A 12-minute, 8-second disco medley of holiday songs performed by the backing band for Salsoul Records, containing the songs: "Joy To The World"/"Deck The Halls"/"O Come All Ye Faithful"/"Jingle Bells"/"Hark! The Herald Angels Sing"/"Santa Claus Is Coming To Town"/"The Christmas Song"/"White Christmas"/"Rudolph The Red-Nosed Reindeer"/"I'll Be Home For Christmas"/"Winter Wonderland"/"The First Noël"/"We Wish You A Merry Christmas". The B-side of the single was "New Year's Medley", a 7-minute, 17-second medley of new year's-related songs.
|-
| "Christmas Memories"
| Frank Sinatra
| 1975
| Also recorded by Alabama (1985), Steve Wariner (1992), Rosemary Clooney (1996), and Barbra Streisand (2001). Sometimes titled "Christmas Mem'ries".
|-
| "Christmas Must Be Tonight"
| The Band
| 1977
| From the album Islands. Written by band member Robbie Robertson, who recorded a solo version in 1988 for the soundtrack to the film Scrooged.
|-
| "Christmas Night in Harlem"
| Louis Armstrong with the Benny Carter Orchestra. 
| 1955
| Song originated in 1934. A hit, in that year, by the Paul Whiteman orchestra.
|-
| "Christmas Party"
| "Two Ton" Baker the Merry Music Maker
| 1948
| Issued as a 2-disc (in a foldout picture sleeve) 78 rpm set on Mercury Records' Miniature Playhouse children's series (songs on the set are "The Night Before Christmas"/"Santa's Toy Shop"/"Up on the House Top"/"Deck The Halls"/"Jingle Bells").
|-
| "Christmas Rappin'"
| Kurtis Blow
| 1979
| Charted on the Billboard R&B chart in 1993, 1994, 1996 and 2000.
|-
|"Christmas Saves The Year"
|Twenty One Pilots
|2020
|
|-
| "The Christmas Shoes"
| NewSong
| 2000
| Spent one week at No. 1 on the Billboard Adult Contemporary chart, and also peaked at No. 42 on the Billboard Hot 100 chart and No. 31 on the Hot Country Songs chart. From the album Sheltering Tree.
|-
| "Christmas Shopping"
| Buck Owens and his Buckaroos
| 1968
| From Owens' album of the same name. Reached No. 5 on the Billboard Christmas chart.
|-
| "Christmas Song"
| Dave Matthews Band
| 2000
|
|-
| "The Christmas Song"
| Angel
| 1977
| A version of the rock band's own 1977 hit "The Winter Song", but featuring alternate lyrics (both tracks featured The California Boys Choir and both were produced by Eddie Leonetti).
|-
| rowspan=14|"The Christmas Song (Merry Christmas to You)"
| The King Cole Trio
| 1946
| Written in 1944 by Mel Tormé and Robert Wells. Sometimes subtitled "Chestnuts Roasting on an Open Fire", but originally subtitled "Merry Christmas to You." Peaked at No. 3 on both the Billboard Records Most-Played On The Air and Juke Box Race Records charts in December 1946.
|-
| rowspan=2|Nat King Cole
| 1953
| With orchestra conducted by Nelson Riddle (Capitol 3561). First entered the Billboard Hot 100 chart on the week ending December 12, 1960, peaking at No. 65 on the week ending December 29, 1962.
|-
| 1961
|Recorded in stereo for the first time with orchestra conducted by Ralph Carmichael; this final Cole version has charted on Billboard Hot 100 every year since 2013 (with the exception of 2014), peaking at No. 9 on the week ending January 7, 2023. Also made these other Billboard music charts (with peak positions shown): Adult Contemporary (No. 16), Adult R&B Airplay (No. 40), Digital Song Sales (No. 18), Global 200 (No. 16), Global 200 Excl. US (No. 38), Greatest of All Time Holiday 100 Songs (No. 4), Holiday 100 (No. 2), Holiday Airplay (No. 1), Holiday Digital Song Sales (No. 3), Holiday Streaming Songs (No. 2), Hot 100 Recurrents (No. 1), Radio Songs (No. 30), R&B/Hip-Hop Digital Song Sales (No. 2), R&B/Hip-Hop Streaming Songs (No. 1), and Streaming Songs (No. 5). It remains the most popular version of the song.
|-
| Les Brown and His Orchestra
| 1946
| Featuring Doris Day on vocal. Debuted and peaked at No. 12 on the Billboard Records Most-Played On The Air chart in January 1947.
|-
| James Brown & The Famous Flames
| 1966
| Peaked at No. 12 on the Billboard Best Selling Christmas Singles chart on the week ending December 17, 1966.
|-
| Herb Alpert
| 1968
| Spent three weeks at No. 1 on the Billboard Christmas Singles chart in December 1968.
|-
| Natalie Cole
| 1991
| Peaked at No. 22 on the Billboard Hot Adult Contemporary chart on the week ending January 4, 1992.
|-
| Toni Braxton
| 1993
| Peaked at No. 57 on the Billboard Hot R&B Airplay chart on the week ending January 8, 1994.
|-
| Reba McEntire
| 1996
| Peaked at No. 63 on the Billboard Hot Country Singles & Tracks chart on the week ending January 11, 1997.
|-
| Trace Adkins
| 1998
| Peaked at No. 64 on the Billboard Hot Country Singles & Tracks chart on the week ending January 2, 1999.
|-
| Martina McBride
| 1998
| Peaked at No. 67 on the Billboard Hot Country Singles & Tracks chart on the week ending December 30, 2000.
|-
| Christina Aguilera
| 1999
| Peaked at No. 18 on the Billboard Hot 100 chart on the week ending January 1, 2000. First version of the song to make the Top 40 portion of the Hot 100 chart.
|-
| Michael Bublé
| 2003
| Peaked at No. 6 on the Billboard Adult Contemporary chart on the week ending December 20, 2003.
|-
| Lauren Daigle
| 2018
| Peaked at No. 33 on the Billboard Holiday 100 and #55 on the Hot 100 in 2019.
|-
| "Christmas Spirit"
| Richard Marx
| 2011
| Written by Richard Marx and Fee Waybill, the song peaked at No. 15 on the Adult Contemporary chart.
|-
| "Christmas Spirits"
| Julia Lee and Her Boy Friends
| 1948
| Peaked at No. 14 on Billboard Best-Selling Retail Race Records chart on the week of January 8, 1949.
|-
| "Christmas Tears"
| Freddy King
| 1961
| R&B hit in 1961; also charted on the Christmas Singles chart in 1964 & 1966. Released in 1964 by The Four Seasons as the B-side to "I Saw Mommy Kissing Santa Claus".
|-
| "Christmas This Year"
| Mêlée
| 2008
|
|-
| "Christmas Through Your Eyes"
| Gloria Estefan
| 1992
| Reached the British pop singles chart in 1992 as a double-A side with "Miami Hit Mix". From the album Christmas Through Your Eyes.
|-
| "Christmas Time" (1)
| Bryan Adams
| 1985
| A different picture sleeve was issued in 1986. Peaked at No. 4 on the Billboard Christmas singles chart, and No. 35 on the Mainstream Rock Tracks chart in 1985.
|-
| "Christmas Time" (2)
| John Anderson
| 1994
| Reached No. 57 on the Billboard Hot Country Singles & Tracks chart in 1995.
|-
| "Christmas Time" (3)
| Christina Aguilera
| 2000
| Released as a promotional single for the album My Kind of Christmas.
|-
| "Christmas Time (Is Here Again)"
| The Beatles
| 1967
| Also recorded by group member Ringo Starr for his 1999 Christmas album I Wanna Be Santa Claus.
|-
| rowspan="2"|"Christmas Time Is Here" (1)
| Vince Guaraldi Trio
| 1965
| Composed and recorded for the soundtrack to the 1965 animated holiday television special, A Charlie Brown Christmas (both instrumental and vocal versions of the song recorded by Guaraldi and included on the soundtrack album). First entered Billboard Holiday 100 chart on the week ending December 10, 2011, peaking at No. 17 on the week ending January 17, 2017. First entered Billboard main Hot 100 chart on the week ending January 1, 2022, peaking at No. 41 one week later. Also made these other Billboard music charts (with peak positions shown): Digital Song Sales (No. 4), Global 200 (No. 82), Greatest of All Time Holiday 100 Songs (No. 27), Holiday Airplay (No. 30), Holiday Digital Song Sales (No. 15), Holiday Streaming Songs (No. 10), Hot 100 Recurrents (No. 3), LyricFind Global (No. 23), LyricFind U.S. (No. 22), and Streaming Songs (No. 26). Melody has similar chord progression to the 1932 Cole Porter jazz standard, "Night and Day."
|-
| Toni Braxton
| 2001
| Debuted and peaked at No. 11 on Billboard Holiday Airplay chart on the week ending December 8, 2001.
|-
| "Christmas Time Is Here" (2)
| Ray Parker Jr.
| 1982
| Re-issued in 1984 as the B-side of Parker's top 40 pop hit single, "Jamie".
|-
| "Christmas Time's A-Comin'"
| Sammy Kershaw
| 1994
| Peaked at No. 50 on the Billboard Country chart in 1995. Recharted in 1998.
|-
| "Christmas Tonight"
| Dave Barnes with Hillary Scott
| 2010
| Reached No. 9 on the Billboard Hot Adult Contemporary Tracks chart.
|-
| "Christmas Tree" (1)
| Lady Gaga featuring Space Cowboy
| 2009
| Reached No. 23 on the Billboard Holiday/Seasonal Digital Songs chart in late 2010.
|-
| "Christmas Tree" (2)
| V
| 2021
| Reached No. 1 on Billboard Holiday Digital Song Sales chart and # 54 on the Holiday 100 on January 8, 2022.
|-
| "The Christmas Tree Angel (Sweet Angie)"
| Fran Allison
| 1951
| Reached No. 14 on the Best Selling Children's chart.
|-
| rowspan="2"|"Christmas Tree Farm"
| rowspan="2"|Taylor Swift
| 2019
| Written and co-produced by Swift. Debuted and peaked at No. 59 on Billboard Hot 100 chart and at No. 19 on Billboard Holiday 100 chart on the week ending December 21, 2019. Also made these other Billboard music charts (with peak positions shown): Adult Contemporary (No. 3), Adult Pop Airplay (No. 40), Global 200 (No. 147), Digital Song Sales (No. 2), Holiday Digital Song Sales (No. 2), and Holiday Streaming Songs (No. 44).
|-
| 2021
| Updated recording of the song referred to as the "Old Timey Version." First entered Billboard main Hot 100 chart on the week ending December 11, 2021, peaking at No. 62 on the week ending January 1, 2022. First entered Billboard Holiday 100 chart on the week ending December 4, 2021, peaking at No. 46 on the week ending January 1, 2022. Also made these other Billboard music charts (with peak positions shown): Adult Contemporary (No. 22), Global 200 (No. 98), Holiday Digital Song Sales (No. 10), Holiday Streaming Songs (No. 40), and Streaming Songs (No. 48).
|-
| "A Christmas Tribute"
| Bob Luman
| 1977
| Peaked at No. 92 on Billboard Hot Country Singles chart on the week ending January 7, 1978.
|-
| "Christmas Vacation"
| Mavis Staples
| 1989
| From the 1989 film National Lampoon's Christmas Vacation. Written by Barry Mann and Cynthia Weil.
|-
| "The Christmas Waltz"
| Harry Connick, Jr.
| 2003
| Hit the Adult Contemporary chart in 2004. Previously recorded by Frank Sinatra in 1954, 1957, and 1968, as well as Kay Starr, Nancy Wilson, The Carpenters, Lawrence Welk, Natalie Cole, and Barry Manilow.
|-
| "Christmas Where You Are"
| Five for Fighting featuring Jim Brickman
| 2017
| Peaked at No. 11 on the Billboard Adult Contemporary chart in early 2018.
|-
| "Christmas Will Be Just Another Lonely Day"
| Brenda Lee
| 1964
| B-side to her single "This Time of the Year". Charted for 1 week in 1964.
|-
| "A Christmas Wish"
| Bobby Goldsboro
| 1968
| Reached No. 11 in Billboard's Christmas singles chart. B-side is "Look Around You (It's Christmas Time)".
|-
| "Christmas with the Devil"
| Spinal Tap
| 1984
| Written by Christopher Guest, Michael McKean & Harry Shearer. Originally issued on Enigma Records with picture sleeve and also a special picture disc issue, both 7"
|-
| "Christmas Without You"
| Kenny Rogers and Dolly Parton
| 1984
| From the album Once Upon a Christmas.
|-
| "Christmas Won't Be the Same This Year"
| The Jackson 5
| 1970
| Peaked at No. 2 on Billboard Christmas Singles chart on the week ending December 26, 1970. Flip side of The Jackson 5's recording of "Santa Claus Is Comin' to Town".
|-
| "Christmas Wrapping"
| The Waitresses
| 1981
| From the 1981 various artists holiday compilation album A Christmas Record on ZE Records. Peaked at No. 67 on Billboard Holiday 100 chart on the week ending December 8, 2018. Also made these other Billboard music charts (with peak positions shown): Alternative Digital Song Sales (No. 2), Digital Song Sales (No. 48), Holiday Digital Song Sales (No. 12), LyricFind Global (No. 5), LyricFind U.S. (No. 2), Rock Digital Song Sales (No. 6), and Rock Streaming Songs (No. 17).
|-
| "Christmastime" (1)
| Aimee Mann with Michael Penn
| 1996
| From the album Just Say Noël. Also used in the film Hard Eight.
|-
| "Christmastime" (2)
| The Smashing Pumpkins
| 1997
| An original song written by Billy Corgan and released on the compilation A Very Special Christmas 3 in aid of the Special Olympics.
|-
| "The Closing of the Year"
| The Musical Cast of Toys featuring Wendy & Lisa
| 1992
| Peaked at No. 53 on Billboard Hot 100 Airplay chart and at No. 37 on Billboard Adult Contemporary chart. Main theme song of the 1992 film Toys.
|-
| "Cold"
| John Gary
| 1967
| Peaked at No. 1 for two weeks on Billboard Adult Contemporary chart in December 1967.
|-
| "Cold Cold Winter"
| The Pixies Three
| 1963
| Peaked at No. 79 on Billboard Hot 100 singles chart in early January 1964.
|-
| "Cold December Night"
| Michael Bublé
| 2011
| Peaked at No. 10 on Billboard Adult Contemporary chart in 2012.
|-
| "Colorado Christmas"
| Nitty Gritty Dirt Band
| 1983
| Peaked at No. 92 on Billboard Hot Country Singles chart in January 1984. Guest vocals by Emmylou Harris.
|-
| "Coming Home for Christmas"
| Jim Brickman
| 2007
| Peaked at No. 4 on the Billboard Hot Adult Contemporary Tracks chart during the Christmas season of 2007. Features Richie McDonald (former lead singer of Lonestar) on lead vocals.
|-
| "Cool Yule"
| Louis Armstrong with the Commanders
| 1953
| Written by Steve Allen. Also a hit remake for singer/actress Bette Midler in 2006.
|-
| "Coventry Carol"
| Robert Shaw
| 1949
| Christmas carol dating from the 16th century.
|-
| "Cozy Little Christmas"
| Katy Perry
| 2018
| Written and produced by Perry, Greg Wells and Ferras Alqaisi. Debuted on Billboard main Hot 100 chart on the week ending December 29, 2018, peaking at No. 53 one week later. Peaked at No. 1 for one week on Billboard Adult Contemporary chart on the week ending December 29, 2018. Also made these other Billboard music charts (with peak positions shown): Adult Pop Airplay (No. 37), Bubbling Under Hot 100 (No. 2), Global 200 (No. 76), Global 200 Excl. US (No. 108), Greatest of All Time Holiday 100 Songs (No. 79), Holiday 100 (No. 30), Holiday Digital Song Sales (No. 19), Holiday Streaming Songs (No. 24), Hot 100 Recurrents (No. 9), and Streaming Songs (No. 39). Also peaked at No. 26 on Rolling Stone Top 100 Songs chart in December 2019.
|-
| "A Crosby Christmas" (Parts 1 & 2)
| Gary, Phillip, Dennis, Lindsay and Bing Crosby
| 1950
| Peaked at No. 22 on Billboard Best Selling Pop Singles chart in late December 1950. Features the Jeff Alexander Chorus with the John Scott Trotter Orchestra and Bing's sons Gary, Lindsay, and twins Phillip & Dennis Crosby. Medley of "That Christmas Feeling"/"I'd Like to Hitch a Ride with Santa Claus"/"The Snowman."
|-
| "Daddy's Drinking Up Our Christmas"
| Commander Cody
| 1973
| Peaked at No. 19 on the Billboard Christmas Singles chart.
|-
| "Dance of the Sugar Plum Fairy"
| Pentatonix
| 2014
| The piece of music is the third movement from The Nutcracker.  Featured on Pentatonix's album That's Christmas to Me, it peaked at No. 27 on the Billboard Holiday 100.
|-
| "Dearest Santa"
| Bobby Vinton
| 1964
| Peaked at No. 8 on the Billboard Christmas Singles chart, and released with the B-side "The Bell That Couldn't Jingle" Also issued with the hit song "Mr. Lonely", as a back-to-back promotional single with a text sleeve. From the album A Very Merry Christmas.
|-
| "December Prayer"
| Idina Menzel
| 2014
| From the album Holiday Wishes.
|-
| rowspan=4|"Deck the Halls"
| Nat King Cole
| 1960
| From Cole's 1960 album The Magic of Christmas. First entered Billboard Hot 100 chart at No. 47 on the week ending December 26, 2020, peaking at No. 16 on the week ending December 31, 2022 (following its second chart re-entry). Also made these other Billboard music charts (with peak positions shown): Global 200 (No. 31), Global 200 Excl. US (No. 83), Greatest of All Time Holiday 100 Songs (No. 63), Holiday 100 (No. 13), Holiday Airplay (No. 36), Holiday Streaming Songs (No. 12), Hot 100 Recurrents (No. 2), R&B Streaming Songs (No. 4), R&B/Hip-Hop Streaming Songs (No. 4), and Streaming Songs (No. 13).
|-
| Mannheim Steamroller
| 1984
| From the 1984 album Mannheim Steamroller Christmas. Peaked at No. 38 on Billboard Hot Adult Contemporary chart (week ending January 7, 1995), at No. 10 on Billboard Holiday Airplay chart (week ending December 22, 2001), and at No. 91 on Billboard Holiday 100 chart (week ending December 13, 2014).
|-
| SHeDAISY
| 1999
| From the 1999 animated movie Mickey's Once Upon a Christmas. Peaked at No. 61 on Billboard Hot 100 chart (week ending January 8, 2000) and at No. 37 on Billboard Hot Country Singles & Tracks chart (week ending January 6, 2001).
|-
| Brian Wilson
| 2005
| From the 2005 album What I Really Want for Christmas. Peaked at No. 8 on Billboard Adult Contemporary chart on the week ending January 7, 2006.
|-
| "Deck the Halls/The Twelve Days of Christmas"
| Kenny G
| 2002
| Medley of two ancient Welsh and English folk carols. From the 2002 album Wishes: A Holiday Album. Peaked at No. 22 on Billboard Adult Contemporary chart on the week ending January 4, 2003.
|-
| "Dig That Crazy Santa Claus"
| Ralph Marterie & His Orchestra
| 1954
| Also recorded by Oscar McLollie & His Honey Jumpers in 1954, and The Brian Setzer Orchestra in 2005.
|-
| "Ding Dong, Ding Dong"
| George Harrison
| 1974
| Peaked at No. 36 on the Billboard Hot 100 singles chart in February 1975.
|-
| rowspan=2|"Do They Know It's Christmas?"
| Band Aid
| 1984
| A benefit recording by an all-star group to assist famine relief in Ethiopia; organized by Bob Geldof of the British rock band The Boomtown Rats. Written by Geldof and Midge Ure of the British rock band Ultravox. A Christmas No. 1 single on the UK singles chart in 1984, and re-recorded on two other separate occasions: Band Aid II in 1989 and Band Aid 20 in 2004.
|-
| Glee Cast
| 2011
| Record for the Glee season 3 episode "Extraordinary Merry Christmas". Peaked at No.92 on the Hot 100
|-
| rowspan=7|"Do You Hear What I Hear?"
| Bing Crosby
| 1963
| Peaked at No. 2 on Billboard Christmas Singles chart in December 1963. Features backing by Ralph Carmichael's chorus and orchestra. Originally recorded by the Harry Simeone Chorale in 1962, which peaked at No. 66 on the Music Vendor survey.
|-
| Andy Williams
| 1965
| Peaked at No. 18 on Billboard Christmas Singles chart in December 1965.
|-
| Vanessa Williams
| 1996
| Peaked at No. 15 on Billboard Adult Contemporary chart in January 1997.
|-
| Carrie Underwood
| 2007
| Peaked at No. 2 for three consecutive weeks on Billboard Adult Contemporary chart in December 2007, at No. 27 on Billboard Hot Country Songs chart in January 2008, and at No. 90 on Billboard Hot 100 chart in January 2008. Also made these other Billboard music charts (with peak positions shown): Country Streaming Songs (No. 18), Holiday 100 (No. 50), Holiday Airplay (No. 17), Holiday Digital Song Sales (No. 23), and Radio Songs (No. 53).
|-
| Carole King
| 2011
| Peaked at No. 14 on Billboard Adult Contemporary chart in January 2012.
|-
| Jordin Sparks
| 2012
| Peaked at No. 7 on Billboard Adult Contemporary chart and at No. 48 on Billboard Holiday Airplay chart in December 2012.
|-
|Russell Watson
| 2016
| Peaked at No. 16 on Billboard Adult Contemporary chart in late December 2017 and early January 2018.
|-
| "Dominick the Donkey (The Italian Christmas Donkey)"
| Lou Monte
| 1960
| Featuring orchestration by Joe Reisman. Peaked at No. 114 on the Billboard Bubbling Under Hot 100 Singles chart.
|-
| "¿Dónde Está Santa Claus? (Where Is Santa Claus?)"
| Augie Rios
| 1958
| Featuring orchestration by Mark Jeffrey. Peaked at No. 47 on the Billboard Hot 100 singles chart. Also covered by actress Charo (1978), and by the rock band Guster (2003).
|-
| "Don't Save It All for Christmas Day"
| Celine Dion
| 1998
|Christian group Avalon covered the song for their 2000 album Joy: A Christmas Collection. Clay Aiken also covered it for his 2004 Christmas collection Merry Christmas with Love.
|-
| "Don't Shoot Me Santa"
| The Killers
| 2007
| Peaked at No. 58 on the Billboard Hot Digital Songs chart and No. 73 on the Pop 100.
|-
| "(Don't Wait 'Till) The Night Before Christmas"
| Eddy Duchin and his Orchestra
| 1938
| Featuring vocals by Stanley Worth. Peaked at No. 9 on the pop singles chart.
|-
| "Dreams of Fireflies (On a Christmas Night)"
| Trans-Siberian Orchestra
| 2012
| Peaked at No. 3 on Billboard Adult Contemporary chart. From the five-song EP of the same name.
|-
| "Early Christmas Morning"
| Cyndi Lauper
| 1998
| From the album Merry Christmas...Have a Nice Life
|-
| "Easier Said Than Done"
| Jon Anderson
| 1986
| Written by Vangelis. From Jon's Christmas album 3 Ships.
|-
| "8 Days of Christmas"
| Destiny's Child
| 2001
| Peaked at No. 57 on the Billboard Hot R&B/Hip-Hop Singles & Tracks chart, and at No. 102 on the Billboard Bubbling Under Hot 100 Singles chart in 2002.
|-
| "Elf's Lament"
| Barenaked Ladies featuring Michael Bublé
| 2004
|
|-
| "Even Santa Claus Gets the Blues"
| Marty Stuart
| 2003
| Peaked at No. 55 on the Billboard Hot Country Singles & Tracks chart in 2004. From the album A Very Special Acoustic Christmas. 
|-
| "Every Year, Every Christmas"
| Luther Vandross
| 1995
| Peaked at No. 32 on the Billboard Hot R&B Airplay chart in 1996.
|-
| "(Everybody's Waitin' for) The Man with the Bag"
| Kay Starr
| 1950
| Written by Irving Taylor, Dudley Brooks, and Hal Stanley. Also recorded by Vonda Shepard (2000), The Brian Setzer Orchestra (2002), Jane Monheit (2005), and Kellie Pickler (2013).
|-
| "Everyday Will Be Like a Holiday"
| William Bell
| 1967
| Peaked at No. 33 on Billboard Best Selling R&B Singles chart in late January and early February 1968. Covered by the Sweet Inspirations in 1969, and by Daryl Hall & John Oates in 2006.
|-
| "Fa La La"
| Jim Brickman featuring Olivia Jade Archbold
| 2011
| Peaked at No. 2 on the Billboard Adult Contemporary Tracks chart.
|-
| "Fall Softly Snow"
| Jim Ed Brown and Helen Cornelius
| 1977
| Reached #91 on the Billboard Hot Country Singles chart.
|-
| "Far Away Blues (Xmas Blues)"
| Johnny Otis Orchestra with Little Esther and Mel Walker
| 1950
| Peaked at No. 6 on Billboard Best Selling Retail Rhythm & Blues Records chart in December 1950.
|-
| "Father Christmas"
| The Kinks
| 1977
| Written by Ray Davies of the Kinks.
|-
| "Favorite Time of Year"
| India Arie & Joe Sample featuring Tori Kelly
| 2015
| Peaked at No. 24 on the Billboard Adult Contemporary chart.
|-
| rowspan=3|"Feliz Navidad"
| José Feliciano
| 1970
| Written by Feliciano. Debuted and peaked at No. 71 on Cashbox Top 100 Singles chart on the week ending December 26, 1970. First entered Billboard Adult Contemporary chart on the week ending January 3, 1998, peaking at No. 12 on the week ending January 8, 2000 (upon its chart re-entry). First entered Billboard Holiday 100 chart on the week ending December 10, 2011, peaking at No. 3 on the week ending January 7, 2012. First entered Billboard main Hot 100 chart on the week ending January 7, 2017, peaking at No. 6 on the week ending January 2, 2021 (following its fourth chart re-entry). Also made these other Billboard music charts (with peak positions shown): Adult Pop Airplay (No. 35), Bubbling Under Hot 100 (No. 5), Digital Song Sales (No. 19), Global 200 (No. 5), Global 200 Excl. US (No. 7), Greatest of All Time Holiday 100 Songs (No. 6), Holiday Airplay (No. 1), Holiday Digital Song Sales (No. 4), Holiday Streaming Songs (No. 7), Hot 100 Recurrents (No. 1), Hot Latin Songs (No. 29), Latin Airplay (No. 29), Latin Digital Song Sales (No. 1), Latin Pop Airplay (No. 28), Latin Streaming Songs (No. 1), LyricFind Global (No. 3), LyricFind U.S. (No. 2), Radio Songs (No. 16), and Streaming Songs (No. 7).
|-
| Clay Walker
| 2002
| Peaked at No. 49 on the Billboard Hot Country Singles & Tracks chart on the week ending January 11, 2003.
|-
| Jon Secada
| 2005
| Peaked at No. 3 on the Billboard Adult Contemporary chart on the week ending January 7, 2006.
|-
| "The First Christmas"
| Danny Thomas
| 1967
| With the Sid Feller orchestra. From the Rankin/Bass animated special The Cricket on the Hearth. Peaked at #24 on Billboard's "Best Bets For Christmas" survey.
|-
| rowspan=2|"The First Noel"
| Clay Aiken
| 2003
| Contemporary version of the traditional English Christmas carol that peaked at No. 9 on the Billboard Hot Adult Contemporary Tracks chart.
|-
| Carrie Underwood
| 2008
| Peaked at No. 50 on Billboard Hot Country Songs chart in January 2009 and at No. 36 on Billboard Holiday Digital Song Sales chart in December 2012.
|-
| "Footprints in the Snow"
| Bill Monroe and his Blue Grass Boys
| 1946
| Peaked at No. 5 on Billboard Most-Played Juke Box Folk Records chart in December 1946.
|-
| rowspan=8|"Frosty the Snowman"
| Gene Autry and The Cass County Boys
| 1950
| Peaked at No. 2 for five consecutive weeks on Billboard Best Selling Children's Records chart in December 1950 and January 1951. Also made these other Billboard music charts in 1950 (with peak positions shown): Best Selling Pop Singles (No. 7) and Best Selling Retail Folk (Country & Western) Records (No. 4). Also made these other Billboard music charts (with peak positions shown): Holiday 100 (No. 90) and Holiday Airplay (No. 49). With orchestra under the direction of Carl Cotner.
|-
| Nat King Cole
| 1950
| Debuted and peaked at No. 9 on Billboard Records Most Played by Disk Jockeys chart in early January 1951. Chipmunk voices provided by The Singing Pussy Cats with orchestra conducted by Pete Rugolo.
|-
| Guy Lombardo and His Royal Canadians
| 1950
| Debuted and peaked at No. 28 on Billboard Records Most Played by Disk Jockeys chart in early January 1951. Vocal chorus by Kenny Gardner and the Lombardo Trio.
|-
| Red Foley and the Little Foleys
| 1951
| Peaked at No. 6 on Billboard Best Selling Children's Records chart in December 1951. The "Little Foleys" are Red's daughters Shirley, Julie and Jenny Foley.
|-
| Jimmy Durante
| 1969
| Peaked at No. 27 on Billboard Holiday 100 chart in early January 2019. Also made these other Billboard music charts in 1950 (with peak positions shown): Holiday Airplay (No. 25), Holiday Digital Song Sales (No. 33), Holiday Streaming Songs (No. 28), and Greatest of All Time Holiday 100 Songs (No. 46). From the 1969 animated television special Frosty the Snowman. Durante originally recorded and released the song in 1951 (on MGM S-K17), with orchestra conducted by Roy Bargy.
|-
| Johnny Mathis
| 2002
| Debuted and peaked at No. 29 on Billboard Adult Contemporary chart in late December 2002 and early January 2003. Also peaked at No. 20 on Billboard Holiday Airplay chart in early December 2002.
|-
| Kimberley Locke
| 2007
| Peaked at No. 1 for one week on Billboard Adult Contemporary chart in December 2007.
|-
| Whitney Wolanin
| 2012
| Peaked at No. 13 on Billboard Adult Contemporary chart in December 2012.
|-
| "Gabriel's Message"
| Sting
| 1985
| Originally the B-side of the 45 rpm of "Russians" in 1985, it was later included on the 1987 holiday compilation album A Very Special Christmas.
|-
| "Gee Whiz, It's Christmas"
| Carla Thomas
| 1963
| Peaked at No. 23 on Billboard Christmas Singles chart in December 1963. Inspired by Thomas's 1961 top 10 hit song "Gee Whiz (Look at His Eyes)".
|-
| "Ghost of My Christmas Past"
| Robin Meade
| 2017
| Peaked at No. 22 on the Billboard Adult Contemporary chart in early 2018.
|-
| "The Gift"
| Jim Brickman
| 1997
| Peaked at No. 3 on the Billboard Hot Adult Contemporary Tracks chart during the Christmas season of 1997. Features Collin Raye and Susan Ashton on lead vocals.
|-
| "The Gift of Giving"
| Bill Withers
| 1972
| Peaked on #5 in Billboard's Christmas survey. The B-side of the pop song "Let Us Love".
|-
| "Give Love on Christmas Day"
| The Jackson 5
| 1970
| Also a R&B hit for Johnny Gill in 1998.
|-
| "Go Tell It on the Mountain"
| Peter, Paul & Mary
| 1964
| Reached No. 7 on the Adult Contemporary chart. A version of this classic spiritual by Garth Brooks was first released in 1992, but didn't make the Billboard Hot Country Songs chart until late 1998/early 1999. A medley of this song with "Mary Had a Baby" was a hit for Vanessa L. Williams in 1993, and inspired her to record a full-length holiday album the following year. Also charted by Little Big Town (2006).
|-
| "God Rest Ye Merry, Gentlemen"
| Garth Brooks
| 2000
| From the album Garth Brooks and the Magic of Christmas. Originally recorded by Garth in 1992. Traditional Christmas carol recorded by hundreds of artists, including MercyMe (2006).
|-
| "Goin' Home (Sing a Song of Christmas Cheer)"
| Bobby Sherman
| 1970
| B-side is "Love's What You're Getting For Christmas". From his 1970 Christmas album. Contains a portion of "Silent Night". Made the Cashbox Top 100 in 1970.
|-
| "Grandma Got Run Over by a Reindeer"
| Elmo & Patsy
| 1979
| Written by Randy Brooks. Originally recorded in 1979, new versions were released in 1982 and 1984. The song hit No. 1 on the Billboard Christmas singles charts during the Christmas seasons of 1983–1985, and bubbled under the Hot 100 in 1992. The best-selling novelty Christmas single of all time in the U.S., it spawned toys and an animated TV special that remain popular each year.
|-
| "A Great Big Sled"
| The Killers
| 2006
| Reached No. 54 on the Billboard Hot 100 chart.
|-
| "The Greatest Gift of All"
| Kenny Rogers and Dolly Parton
| 1984
| Reached the Billboard Hot 100, Country, and Adult Contemporary charts in early 1985. From the album Once Upon a Christmas.
|-
| "Greatest Time of Year"
| Aly & AJ
| 2006
| From the album Acoustic Hearts of Winter. Also used in the film The Santa Clause 3.
|-
| "Green Chri$tma$"
| Stan Freberg
| 1958
| Featuring Daws Butler, Marvin Miller and Wil Wright in a "commercial" parody of Scrooge.
|-
| "Grown-Up Christmas List"
| David Foster featuring Natalie Cole
| 1990
| Written by David Foster (music) and Linda Thompson Jenner (lyrics). Other hit versions include Amy Grant (1992), Barbra Streisand (2001), Michael Bublé (2003), Kelly Clarkson (2003), and Clay Aiken (2006).
|-
| "Hallelujah" (1)
| Pentatonix
| 2016
| Written and originally recorded by Leonard Cohen, and first released on his 1984 album, Various Positions. Covered by several artists before Pentatonix released their version, which both debuted and peaked at No. 2 on Billboard Holiday 100 chart on the week ending December 10, 2016, and peaked at No. 23 on Billboard main Hot 100 chart on the week ending January 7, 2017. Also made these other Billboard music charts (with peak positions shown): Adult Contemporary (No. 4), Digital Song Sales (No. 5), Global 200 (No. 55), Global 200 Excl. US (No. 80), Greatest of All Time Holiday 100 Songs (No. 26), Holiday Digital Song Sales (No. 1), Holiday Streaming Songs (No. 2), Hot 100 Recurrents (No. 8), and Streaming Songs (No. 17). 
|-
| "Hallelujah" (2)
|  & John Legend
| 2020
| Written by Legend and Toby Gad, and first released on Underwood's 2020 album, My Gift. Peaked at No. 39 on Billboard Holiday 100 chart and at No. 54 on Billboard main Hot 100 chart (both on the week ending January 2, 2021). Also made these other Billboard music charts (with peak positions shown): Adult Contemporary (No. 3), Bubbling Under Hot 100 (No. 13), Christian Digital Song Sales (No. 1), Christian Streaming Songs (No. 2), Country Airplay (No. 57), Country Digital Song Sales (No. 4), Country Streaming Songs (No. 9), Digital Song Sales (No. 11), Global 200 (No. 126), Holiday Digital Song Sales (No. 1), Holiday Streaming Songs (No. 43), Hot Christian Songs (No. 1), and Hot Country Songs (No. 3).
|-
| "Hangin' Round the Mistletoe"
| Brooks & Dunn
| 2002
| Hit the Billboard Hot Country Singles chart. From the album It Won't Be Christmas Without You.
|-
| "Happy Birthday, Jesus"
| Patti Page
| 1967
| Peaked at #15 on Billboard's Christmas Chart 12/16/1967.  Backing music is "Silent Night"; issued with 2 different picture sleeves.
|-
| "Happy Christmas, Little Friend"
| Rosemary Clooney
| 1953
| Written by Rodgers and Hammerstein. Official song of the 1953 Christmas Seals campaign. Also recorded by Dinah Shore (1957).
|-
| "The Happy Elf"
| Harry Connick, Jr.
| 2005
| From the album Harry for the Holidays.
|-
| "Happy Holiday"
| Bing Crosby
| 1942
| Written by Irving Berlin for the 1942 film Holiday Inn, co-starring Crosby and Fred Astaire. Hit versions were recorded by Peggy Lee and Steve Lawrence & Eydie Gorme. The Lawrence-Gorme version, released as a single, made the Cash Box Christmas singles chart in 1964.
|-
| "Happy Holiday/The Holiday Season"
| Andy Williams
| 1963
| Medley arrangement of the songs "Happy Holiday" and "The Holiday Season" (the latter written by Kay Thompson in 1945). First entered Billboard Holiday 100 chart on the week ending December 10, 2011, peaking at No. 12 on the week ending December 14, 2019. First entered Billboard main Hot 100 chart on the week ending December 14, 2019, peaking at No. 18 on the week ending January 2, 2021 (following its first chart re-entry). Also made these other Billboard music charts (with peak positions shown): Global 200 (No. 56), Greatest of All Time Holiday 100 Songs (No. 23), Holiday Airplay (No. 9), Holiday Digital Song Sales (No. 11), Holiday Streaming Songs (No. 9), Hot 100 Recurrents (No. 3), and Streaming Songs (No. 14).
|-
| "Happy New Year" (1)
| Judy Garland
| 1957
| From the album Alone. Written by Gordon Jenkins. Also recorded by Nat King Cole (1962).
|-
| "Happy New Year" (2)
| ABBA
| 1980
| Released as a CD single in 1999.
|-
| "The Happy Reindeer"
| Russ Regan
| 1959
| Peaked at No. 34 on the Billboard Hot 100 singles chart. Novelty song inspired by "The Chipmunk Song (Christmas Don't Be Late)". Performed under the pseudonym "Dancer, Prancer and Nervous, the Singing Reindeer".
|-
| rowspan=5|"Happy Xmas (War Is Over)"
| John and Yoko and The Plastic Ono Band with the Harlem Community Choir
| 1971
| Written by John Lennon and Yoko Ono. Debuted and peaked at No. 3 on Billboard Christmas Singles chart on the week ending December 25, 1971 (re-entering this same chart in 1972, 1983, 1984, and 1985). First entered Billboard main Hot 100 chart on the week ending December 29, 2018, peaking at No. 38 on the week ending December 31, 2022 (upon its chart re-entry). Also made these other Billboard music charts (with peak positions shown): Adult Contemporary (No. 32), Adult Pop Airplay (No. 34), Digital Song Sales (No. 34), Global 200 (No. 25), Global 200 Excl. US (No. 26), Greatest of All Time Holiday 100 Songs (No. 16), Holiday 100 (No. 9), Holiday Airplay (No. 2), Holiday Digital Song Sales (No. 1), Holiday Streaming Songs (No. 18), Hot 100 Recurrents (No. 1), LyricFind Global (No. 4), LyricFind U.S. (No. 5), Rock Digital Song Sales (No. 4), Rock Streaming Songs (No. 3), and Streaming Songs (No. 34).
|-
| Celine Dion
| 1998
| Peaked at No. 32 on Billboard Holiday 100 chart and at No. 5 on Billboard Holiday Streaming Songs chart on the week ending January 11, 2014.
|-
| Sarah McLachlan
| 2006
| Peaked at No. 3 on Billboard Adult Contemporary chart on the week ending January 6, 2007, and at No. 7 on Billboard Bubbling Under Hot 100 chart on the week ending December 23, 2006.
|-
| Josh Groban
| 2017
| Peaked at No. 4 on Billboard Adult Contemporary chart on the week ending January 3, 2018, and at No. 36 on Billboard Holiday Digital Song Sales chart on the week ending November 4, 2017.
|-
| John Legend
| 2019
| Debuted and peaked at No. 69 on Billboard Hot 100 chart on the week ending January 4, 2020. Also made these other Billboard music charts (with peak positions shown): Adult Contemporary (No. 15), Bubbling Under Hot 100 (No. 3), Holiday 100 (No. 45), Holiday Streaming Songs (No. 30), Hot R&B Songs (No. 7), and R&B Streaming Songs (No. 8).
|-
| "Hard Candy Christmas"
| Dolly Parton
| 1982
| Peaked at No. 8 on the Billboard country charts. From the movie The Best Little Whorehouse in Texas. Written by Carol Hall in 1978 and originally recorded by the female cast of the Broadway play of the same title.
|-
| "Hark! The Herald Angels Sing"
| Carrie Underwood
| 2008
| Reached No. 14 on the Billboard Hot Adult Contemporary Tracks chart during the Christmas season of 2008.
|-
| rowspan=9| "Have Yourself a Merry Little Christmas"
| 
| 1944
| Peaked at No. 27 on the pop singles chart. Featuring orchestration by Georgie Stoll. Written by Ralph Blane and Hugh Martin, and introduced in the 1944 film Meet Me in St. Louis starring Garland. Other charted versions were recorded by Vince Gill (1993), Kenny G (1994), Martina McBride (1999), Lonestar (2000), Neal McCoy (2001), Ruben Studdard & Tamyra Gray (2003), Aimee Mann (2006), Barry Manilow (2007), Colbie Caillat (2009), and Train (2015).
|-
| 
| 1948
| His first recorded version was featured on Columbia album, Christmas Songs by Sinatra.  He rerecorded the song for his 1957 Capitol album, A Jolly Christmas from Frank Sinatra. Sinatra peaked at #14 on the Billboards Holiday 100 with the title in 2015.
|-
| 
| 1978
| From their Christmas Portrait LP, the song peaked at #27 on Billboard'''s Holiday Songs chart in 2010.
|-
| 
| 1992
| Featured on her album Home For Christmas, the song peaked at #6 on Billboards Holiday Songs chart in 2002.
|-
| 
| 2000
| Featured on her album My Kind of Christmas, the song peaked at #31 on Billboards Holiday 100 in 2015.
|-
| 
| 2001
| Peaked at #14 in 2001 on Billboards Holiday Songs chart.
|-
| 
| 2001
| Peaked at #3 on Billboards Holiday Songs chart in 2002.  
|-
| 
| 2011
| From his chart topping album Christmas, his version peaked at #24 on Billboards Holiday 100 in 2019.
|-
| 
| 2014
| Smith was the first to chart on the Billboard Hot 100 in that chart's entire history. The song also peaked at #9 on Holiday 100
|-
| "The Heart of Christmas"
| Matthew West
| 2011
| Peaked at No. 6 on Billboard's Adult Contemporary chart for the weeks of December 17, 2011 and December 24, 2011.
|-
| "Hello, Mr. Kringle"
| Kay Kyser and his Orchestra
| 1939
| Novelty record with Ginny Simms, Ish Kabibble, Sully Mason & Harry Babbitt on vocals.
|-
| "Here Comes Santa Claus (Right Down Santa Claus Lane)"
| Gene Autry
| 1947
| First released in 1947 on Columbia 37942 as by Gene Autry with Vocal Group. Peaked at No. 4 on Billboard Best-Selling Retail Folk Records chart (week ending December 25, 1948), at No. 7 on Billboard Most-Played Juke Box Folk Records chart (week ending December 25, 1948), at No. 8 on Billboard Best-Selling Popular Retail Records chart (week ending January 1, 1949), at No. 9 on Billboard Records Most Played By Disk Jockeys chart (week ending January 1, 1949), at No. 10 on Billboard Best-Selling Children's Records chart (week ending December 24, 1949), and at No. 8 on Billboard Country & Western Records Most Played By Folk Disk Jockeys chart (week ending January 7, 1950). First entered Billboard Hot 100 chart on the week ending December 22, 2018, peaking at No. 26 on the week ending January 2, 2021, following its second chart re-entry. Also made these other Billboard music charts (with peak positions shown): Country Streaming Songs (No. 4), Global 200 (No. 78), Holiday 100 (No. 10), Holiday Airplay (No. 8), Holiday Streaming Songs (No. 8), Hot 100 Recurrents (No. 2), and Streaming Songs (No. 14).
|-
| "Here It Is Christmas/Baby, It's Cold Outside"
| Kenny Rogers featuring Jennifer Nettles
| 2015
| Peaked at No. 18 on the Billboard Adult Contemporary chart.
|-
| "Here's Your Sign Christmas"
| Bill Engvall
| 1998
| A Christmas version of his 1997 debut hit "Here's Your Sign" with Travis Tritt. A No. 1 hit on the Billboard Country Singles chart in 2003.
|-
| "Hey America"
| James Brown
| 1970
| Bubbled under the Hot 100 in 1970.
|-
| "Hey Santa!"
| Carnie and Wendy Wilson
| 1993
| Bubbled under the Hot 100 in 1994. From the album Hey Santa!.
|-
| "Hitch a Ride with Santa"
| Jim Brickman with Charlie Alan
| 2015
| Peaked at No. 22 on the Billboard Adult Contemporary chart.
|-
| "Holiday Hootenanny"
| Paul & Paula
| 1963
| Peaked at #19 on Billboard's Christmas Singles Chart on 12/28/1963.  An adaptation of "Jingle Bells".
|-
| "Holiday in Cambodia"
| Richard Cheese
| 2006
| Straight lounge-music cover of the Dead Kennedys song with jingling bells in the background and a "Merry Christmas" shoutout at the end.
|-
| rowspan=4|"A Holly Jolly Christmas"
| Burl Ives
| 1964
| Written by Johnny Marks in 1962. Peaked at No. 13 on Billboard Christmas Singles survey on the week ending December 26, 1964 (re-entering this same survey at No. 29 on the week ending December 28, 1968). First entered Billboard Holiday 100 chart on the week ending December 10, 2011, peaking at No. 3 on the week ending December 14, 2019. First entered Billboard main Hot 100 chart on the week ending January 7, 2017, making the top 10 of this chart for the first time on the week ending January 5, 2019, and attaining an overall peak position of No. 4 one year later on the week ending January 4, 2020 (58 years and two weeks after Ives' previous top 5 single). Also made these other Billboard music charts (with peak positions shown): Adult Contemporary (No. 30), Country Digital Song Sales (No. 5), Country Streaming Songs (No. 1), Digital Song Sales (No. 14), Global 200 (No. 10), Global 200 Excl. US (No. 48), Greatest of All Time Holiday 100 Songs (No. 5), Holiday Airplay (No. 1), Holiday Digital Song Sales (No. 6), Holiday Streaming Songs (No. 3), Hot 100 Recurrents (No. 3), LyricFind Global (No. 2), LyricFind U.S. (No. 1), Radio Songs (No. 21), Ringtones (No. 29), and Streaming Songs (No. 3). First released by The Quinto Sisters in 1964, but made famous by Ives in the 1964 animated holiday television special, Rudolph, the Red-Nosed Reindeer, albeit with a different recording than the one that gained popularity as a single.
|-
| Alan Jackson
| 1992
| From the 1992 film Home Alone 2: Lost in New York. Peaked at No. 51 on the Billboard Hot Country Singles & Tracks chart on the week ending January 10, 1998.
|-
| Michael Bublé
| 2011
| Peaked at No. 3 on the Billboard Adult Contemporary chart on the week ending December 17, 2011, and at No. 22 on the Billboard Holiday 100 chart on the week ending December 29, 2012.
|-
| Lady Antebellum
| 2012
| Peaked at No. 2 on the Billboard Adult Contemporary chart on the week ending December 22, 2012, and at No. 43 on the Billboard Holiday 100 chart on the week ending December 9, 2017.
|-
| "The Holly and the Ivy"
| Petula Clark
| 1958
| One of the first British stereo releases, on the EP, A Christmas Carol.
|-
| "Home for Christmas"
| Daryl Hall & John Oates
| 2006
| From the album Home for Christmas. Not to be confused with "I'll Be Home for Christmas".
|-
| "Honky Tonk Christmas"
| Alan Jackson
| 1993
| Reached No. 53 on the Billboard Hot Country Singles chart in 1993. From the album Honky Tonk Christmas. Recharted in 1995.
|-
| "Hooray for Santa Claus"
| Al Hirt
| 1964
| Peaked at #9 on Billboard's Christmas Chart 12/19/1964.  Written by Milton DeLugg and Roy Alfred. From the 1964 science fiction film Santa Claus Conquers the Martians.
|-
| "How Lovely Is Christmas"
| Bing Crosby
| 1957
| With the Arthur Norman choir and orchestra. Written by Arnold Sundgaard and Alec Wilder.
|-
| "Hurry Home for Christmas"
| Robert Goulet
| 1968
| Written and originally recorded by Steve Lawrence and Eydie Gormé. Goulet's version reached No. 19 in Billboard Christmas survey, 1968.
|-
| "I Believe in Father Christmas"
| Greg Lake
| 1975
| Written by Greg Lake and Peter Sinfield. Peaked at No. 2 on the Official Singles Chart.
|-
| "I Don't Intend to Spend Christmas Without You"
| Margo Guryan
| 2001
| Written and recorded by Guryan as a demo in 1967, and also released as a single by Claudine Longet that year. Covered by Saint Etienne for a 1998 fan club single.
|-
| "I Don't Wanna Spend One More Christmas Without You"
| 'N Sync
| 2001
| Reached No. 24 on the Billboard Hot Adult Contemporary Tracks chart.
|-
| "I Farted on Santa's Lap (Now Christmas Is Gonna Stink for Me)"
| The Little Stinkers
| 1998
| Novelty song first released in 1998. Charted briefly on Billboard magazine's Hot 100 Singles Sales chart in 2002.
|-
| "I Heard the Bells on Christmas Day"
| Bing Crosby
| 1956
| Other singers with popular versions: Nat King Cole, The Carpenters, Harry Belafonte, Burl Ives, Johnny Mathis and Sarah McLachlan.
|-
| "I Only Want You for Christmas"
| Alan Jackson
| 1991
| Reached No. 41 on the Billboard Hot Country Singles chart in 1991. Recharted in 1995 and 1998.
|-
| rowspan=4 | "I Saw Mommy Kissing Santa Claus"
| 
| 1952
| Reached No. 1 on both the Billboard Pop chart and Best Selling Children's chart in 1952. Written by Tommie Connor. 
|-
| 
| 1952
| Peaked at #4 on Billboard's Pop chart. Also charted by Molly Bee in 1952 peaking at #19 on Billboard's Pop Singles survey.  Other popular recordings were made by The Ronettes (1963), John Mellencamp (1987), Reba McEntire (1999), and Jessica Simpson.
|-
|  
| 1964
| Peaked at #19 on Billboard's Christmas Records Charts. 
|-
|  
| 1970 
| Featured on their Jackson 5 Christmas Album.  The song later peaked on Billboard's Holiday 100 at #45 in 2012.
|-
| "I Saw Three Ships"
| Sting
| 1997
| This 'new age' version of the traditional carol was a charity single and video.
|-
| "I Want a Hippopotamus for Christmas"
| Gayla Peevey
| 1953
| Written by John Rox. Features orchestration by Norman Leyden. Also recorded by The Three Stooges in 1960.
|-
| "I Want Eddie Fisher for Christmas"
| Betty Johnson
| 1954
| Released during the height of the Eddie Fisher craze. Peaked at No. 22 on the Music Vendor chart. Also recorded by Spike Jones during the same Christmas season.
|-
| "I Wish Everyday Could Be Like Christmas"
| Jon Bon Jovi
| 1992
| B-side to the Bon Jovi song "Keep the Faith". Also replaced "Back Door Santa" on later pressings of the 1987 various artists holiday compilation A Very Special Christmas.
|-
| "I Wish It Could Be Christmas Everyday"
| Wilson Phillips
| 2010
| Peaked at No. 13 on Billboard's Adult Contemporary chart in early 2011. Remake of the 1973 UK hit by Wizzard. Re-recorded by the writer, Wizzard frontman Roy Wood, with his Roy Wood Big Band as a live single in 1995. Also covered by the A*Teens (2002), The Big Reunion, and Girls Aloud.
|-
| "I Won't Be Home for Christmas"
| Blink-182
| 2001
| Reached No. 34 on Billboard Hot 100 Sales chart.
|-
| "I Yust Go Nuts at Christmas"
| Yogi Yorgesson with the Johnny Duffy Trio
| 1949
| Written by Yorgesson under his real name, Harry Stewart. Peaked at #5 on Billboard's "Best Seller" and "Most Played By Jockeys" chart. Covered live by farm broadcaster Orion Samuelson and the Uff da Band.
|-
| "I'll Be Home"
| Meghan Trainor
| 2014
| Written, produced and recorded by Trainor, and a track included the 2014 Epic Records label holiday EP, I'll Be Home for Christmas. Peaked at No. 5 on Billboard Adult Contemporary chart in late December 2014.
|-
| "I'll Be Home for Christmas"
| Bing Crosby
| 1943
| Written during World War II by Kim Gannon, Walter Kent and Buck Ram to honor soldiers overseas. Charted covers include versions by Frank Sinatra, The Brothers Four (1966), Lonestar (1997), Reba McEntire (1999), Neal McCoy (2001), Kenny Chesney (2003), Josh Groban and Camila Cabello.  On Billboard Adult Contemporary chart, versions by Brian McKnight (2008), Kelly Clarkson (2012), and Kanisha K (2015) also charted.
|-
| "I'll Make Every Day Christmas (For My Woman)"
| Joe Tex
| 1967
| Peaked at No. 15 on the Billboard Christmas charts.
|-
| "I'm Gonna Be Warm This Winter"
| Connie Francis
| 1962
| Charted on the Billboard Hot 100 and Adult Contemporary charts in 1962.
|-
| "I'm Gonna Lasso Santa Claus"
| Brenda Lee
| 1956
| Written by Frankie Adams & Wilbur Jones. Credited as "Little Brenda Lee (9 Years Old)" though she turned 12 in 1956.
|-
| "I've Got My Love to Keep Me Warm"
| Les Brown & His Orchestra
| 1948
| Written in 1937 by Irving Berlin and introduced in the 1937 film On the Avenue by its stars, Dick Powell and Alice Faye. Les Brown's instrumental hit version was recorded in 1946, but didn't become a million-selling top 10 song until late 1948 and early 1949. Three other versions by the Mills Brothers, Art Lund, and the Starlighters also hit the pop singles chart in early 1949. The song has also been recorded by such artists as Ray Noble & His Orchestra, Billie Holiday, Ella Fitzgerald, Doris Day, Dean Martin, Frank Sinatra, Bette Midler and Kimberley Locke.
|-
| "If Every Day Was Like Christmas"
| Elvis Presley with The Jordanaires and The Imperials Quartet
| 1966
| Written by Red West. Charted again in 1967.
|-
| "If We Make It Through December"
| Merle Haggard
| 1973
| From the album A Christmas Present. Charted again in 1974. Made the Pop, Country, Easy Listening and Christmas surveys in Billboard in late 1973-early 1974.
|-
| "It Came Upon a Midnight Clear"
| Daryl Hall & John Oates
| 2006
| A No. 1 hit on the Billboard Hot Adult Contemporary Tracks chart. Traditional carol previously recorded by over 100 other artists.
|-
| "It Doesn't Have to Be That Way"
| Jim Croce
| 1973
| Originally released as the B-side of his 1973 single "One Less Set of Footsteps". Reissued as an A-side in December 1973, reaching No. 64 on the Billboard Hot 100 chart.
|-
| "It May Be Winter Outside (But in My Heart It's Spring)"
| Felice Taylor
| 1967
| Written by Barry White. Also a hit for Love Unlimited in 1973.
|-
| "It Must Have Been the Mistletoe"
| Barbara Mandrell
| 1984
| Also a hit for Barbra Streisand in 2002.
|-
| "It Wasn't His Child"
| Sawyer Brown
| 1988
| Written by Skip Ewing. Peaked at No. 51 on the Billboard Hot Country Singles chart in 1989. Also a hit for Trisha Yearwood in 1994.
|-
| "It Won't Be Christmas Without You"
| Brooks & Dunn
| 2002
| Hit the Billboard Hot Country Singles chart. From the album It Won't Be Christmas Without You.
|-
| "It Won't Be the Same This Year"
| Vince Gill
| 1995
| From the 1993 album Let There Be Peace on Earth. Peaked at No. 74 on the Billboard Hot Country Singles chart.
|-
| "It Wouldn't Be Christmas (Without You)"
| John Tesh
| 2002
| Peaked at No. 7 on Billboard Adult Contemporary chart. From the album Christmas Worship.
|-
| rowspan=3|"It's Beginning to Look a Lot Like Christmas"
| Perry Como and The Fontane Sisters with Mitchell Ayres & His Orchestra
| 1951
| Peaked at No. 19 on the Billboard Records Most Played by Disk Jockeys chart on the week ending January 5, 1952, and at No. 23 on the Billboard Best Selling Pop Singles chart on the week ending December 22, 1951. First entered Billboard main Hot 100 chart at No. 42 on the week ending December 29, 2018, peaking at No. 12 on the week ending December 26, 2020 (following its second chart re-entry). Also made these other Billboard music charts (with peak positions shown): Global 200 (No. 27), Global 200 Excl. US (No. 93), Greatest of All Time Holiday 100 Songs (No. 33), Holiday 100 (No. 8), Holiday Airplay (No. 41), Holiday Streaming Songs (No. 5), Hot 100 Recurrents (No. 4), LyricFind Global (No. 14), LyricFind U.S. (No. 14), and Streaming Songs (No. 5). Composed by Meredith Willson while she was writing The Music Man.
|-
| Johnny Mathis
| 1986
| From the 1986 album Christmas Eve with Johnny Mathis. Peaked at No. 15 on Billboard Holiday 100 chart (week ending December 10, 2016), at No. 3 on Billboard Holiday Airplay chart (week ending January 3, 2009), at No. 22 on Billboard Holiday Streaming Songs chart (week ending December 10, 2016), and at No. 44 on Billboard Holiday Digital Songs chart (week ending November 23, 2019).
|-
| Michael Bublé
| 2011
| Peaked at No. 2 on Billboard Adult Contemporary chart on the week ending December 24, 2011, after entering Billboard Hot 100 chart at No. 96 one week earlier. Peaked at No. 20 on the Hot 100 chart on the week ending December 11, 2021 (upon its second chart re-entry). Also made these other Billboard music charts (with peak positions shown): Digital Song Sales (No. 16), Global 200 (No. 6), Holiday 100 (No. 8), Holiday Airplay (No. 22), Holiday Digital Song Sales (No. 3), Holiday Streaming Songs (No. 2), Hot 100 Recurrents (No. 3), Hot Christian Songs (No. 32), and Streaming Songs (No. 11).
|-
| "It's Christmas"
| Ronnie Milsap
| 1986
| From the album Christmas with Ronnie Milsap. Later covered by Trace Adkins.
|-
| "It's Christmas (All Over the World)"
| Sheena Easton
| 1985
| From the 1985 film Santa Claus: The Movie.
|-
| "It's Christmas Time All Over the World"
| Sammy Davis, Jr.
| 1963
| Also recorded by the Jackie Gleason orchestra.
|-
| "(It's Gonna Be a) Lonely Christmas"
| The Orioles
| 1948
| Reached No. 8 on Billboard magazine's R&B Juke Box chart in 1948, and No. 5 on the same singles chart the following year.
|-
| "It's Just Another New Year's Eve"
| Barry Manilow
| 1977
| Peaked at No. 33 on the Billboard Adult Contemporary chart in 1978. From the album Barry Manilow Live.
|-
| "It's So Close to Christmas (And I'm So Far From Home)"
| The Bellamy Brothers
| 1981
| Reached No. 62 on the Billboard Hot Country Singles chart in 1981.
|-
| rowspan=5|"It's the Most Wonderful Time of the Year"
| Andy Williams
| 1963
| Written in 1963 by George Wyle and Edward Pola, and selected as the theme song for Christmas Seals in both 1968 and 1976. First entered Billboard Holiday 100 chart on the week ending December 10, 2011, peaking at No. 2 on the week ending December 8, 2018. First entered Billboard main Hot 100 chart at No. 48 on the week ending January 7, 2017, reaching the top 10 for the first time on the week ending December 29, 2018, and peaking at No. 5 two years later on the week ending January 2, 2021 (following its fourth chart re-entry; Williams' highest rank on the Hot 100 chart since 1963). Also made these other Billboard music charts (with peak positions shown): Digital Song Sales (No. 50), Global 200 (No. 7), Global 200 Excl. US (No. 10), Greatest of All Time Holiday 100 Songs (No. 7), Holiday Airplay (No. 2), Holiday Digital Song Sales (No. 1), Holiday Streaming Songs (No. 2), Hot 100 Recurrents (No. 2), LyricFind U.S. (No. 21), Radio Songs (No. 27), and Streaming Songs (No. 3).
|-
| Johnny Mathis
| 1986
| Peaked at No. 76 on the Billboard Holiday 100 chart on the week ending December 13, 2014, and at No. 7 on the Billboard Holiday Airplay chart on the week ending December 10, 2005.
|-
| Garth Brooks
| 1999
| Peaked at No. 56 on the Billboard Hot Country Singles & Tracks chart on the week ending January 8, 2000.
|-
| BarlowGirl
| 2008
| Peaked at No. 21 on the Billboard Hot Christian Songs chart and at No. 25 on the Billboard Christian AC Songs chart (both on the week ending January 3, 2009).
|-
| Harry Connick, Jr.
| 2008
| Peaked at No. 9 on the Billboard Adult Contemporary chart on the week ending December 20, 2008.
|-
| "Jesu, Joy of Man's Desiring"
| Josh Groban
| 2005
| The most famous instrumental version is George Winston's "Joy" from the album December.
|-
| rowspan=8|"Jingle Bell Rock"
| Bobby Helms
| 1957
| Written by Joe Beale and Jim Boothe, and featuring backing vocals by the Anita Kerr Singers. Peaked at No. 6 on Billboard Top 100 Sides chart and at No. 7 on Billboard Best Sellers In Stores chart on the week ending January 4, 1958. First entered Billboard main Hot 100 chart on the week ending December 22, 1958 (originally peaking at No. 35 one week later), then reaching the top 10 for the first time on the week ending January 5, 2019 (following its seventh chart re-entry), and then attaining an overall peak position of No. 3 on the week ending January 4, 2020 (setting the record for the longest wait for the first top 5 hit after an artist's initial appearance on the chart: 61 years, 4 months and 2 weeks). First entered Billboard Holiday 100 chart on the week ending December 10, 2011, peaking at No. 2 on the week ending December 24, 2016. Also made these other Billboard music charts (with peak positions shown): Adult Contemporary (No. 18), Country Airplay (No. 60), Country Digital Song Sales (No. 3), Country Streaming Songs (No. 1), Digital Song Sales (No. 8), Global 200 (No. 4), Global 200 Excl. US (No. 5), Greatest of All Time Holiday 100 Songs (No. 3), Holiday Airplay (No. 1), Holiday Digital Song Sales (No. 2), Holiday Streaming Songs (No. 2), Hot 100 Recurrents (No. 1), Hot Country Songs (No. 60), LyricFind Global (No. 18), Radio Songs (No. 23), Streaming Songs (No. 2), Top Triller Global (No. 10), and Top Triller U.S. (No. 4).
|-
| Chet Atkins
| 1961
| Peaked at No. 106 on the Billboard Bubbling Under The Hot 100 chart on the week ending January 7, 1962.
|-
| Bobby Rydell & Chubby Checker
| 1961
| Peaked at No. 21 on the Billboard Hot 100 chart on the week ending January 7, 1962.
|-
| Brenda Lee
| 1964
| First entered the Billboard Christmas Singles chart on the week ending December 19, 1964, peaking at No. 8 on this same chart on the week ending December 16, 1967.
|-
| Daryl Hall & John Oates 
| 1983
| Peaked at No. 6 on the Billboard Holiday Airplay chart on the week ending December 13, 2008, and at No. 24 on the Billboard Holiday 100 chart on the week ending December 10, 2011.
|-
| George Strait
| 1999
| Peaked at No. 69 on the Billboard Hot Country Singles & Tracks chart on the week ending January 1, 2000.
|-
| Aaron Tippin
| 2001
| Peaked at No. 52 on the Billboard Hot Country Singles & Tracks chart on the week ending January 12, 2002.
|- 
| Newsboys
| 2010
| Peaked at No. 15 on the Billboard Hot Christian Songs chart and at No. 9 on the Billboard Christian AC Songs chart on the week ending January 8, 2011.
|-
| rowspan=10| "Jingle Bells"
|  and his Orchestra
| 1935
| Peaked at #18 on Billboard's popular singles chart.  The B-Side was "Santa Claus Is Comin' To Town" by the Tommy Dorsey Orchestra. In 1946, hit versions were recorded by Frank Sinatra with The Ken Lane Singers and Perry Como. Other hit versions were recorded by Peggy Lee (1960), Jo Stafford (1964), Smokey Robinson & The Miracles (1970), Barry Manilow duet with Exposé (1991), BeBe & CeCe Winans (1993), SheDaisy (2000), Kenny Chesney (2003). and the Glee Cast (2010). 
|-
|  and his Orchestra 
| 1941
| Features vocals by Tex Beneke, Ernie Caceres and The Modernaires.  It peaked at #5 on Billboard's popular singles chart.
|-
|  and The Andrews Sisters
| 1943
| Peaked at #19 on Billboard's popular singles chart.  The flip side is their version of "Santa Claus Is Comin' To Town" which also charted.  
|-
| 
| 1951
| Peaked at #10 on Billboard's popular singles chart.   
|-
| 
| 1955
| The 1955 novelty version by Don Charles & The Singing Dogs made the Billboard special Christmas singles chart in 1971–1973, 1983 and 1984 peaking at #1 in 1972.  Initially released as the b-side to "Oh! Susanna" which peaked at #22 on Billboard's Top 100 in 1955.
|-
| 
| 1964
| Peaked at #21 on Billboard's Christmas Holiday Charts.  From their popular album Sound of Christmas  
|-
| Booker T. & the MG's
| 1966
| Peaked at #20 on Billboard's Christmas Holiday Charts. From their popular album In the Christmas Spirit. 
|-
| Yello
| 1995
| The only holiday song to chart Billboard dance charts peaked at #44.  The song is featured on the soundtrack to The Santa Clause.
|-
| 
| 2006
| Spent one week at No. 1 on Billboard Hot Adult Contemporary Tracks chart in 2006.  From her popluar Christmas album. 
|-
|  featuring The Puppini Sisters
| 2011
| From his popular Christmas album, this version was recorded in the style of Bing Crosby and The Andrew Sisters and peaked at #37 on the Billboard Holiday 100.
|-
| "Jingo Jango"
| Bert Kaempfert and his Orchestra
| 1963
| Instrumental composed by Bert Kaempfert and Herbert Rehbein. Peaked at #8 on Billboard's Christmas Single chart 12/7/1963. Charted again in 1965.
|-
| "Joy to the World"
| Mannheim Steamroller
| 1995
| From the album Christmas in the Aire. First recorded by The Trinity Choir in 1911. Also released by Mariah Carey (1995), and Faith Hill (2008). A 2015 version by Pentatonix peaked at No. 9 on the Billboard Adult Contemporary chart in 2015.
|-
| "A Joyful Noise"
| Jo Dee Messina
| 2002
| From the album A Joyful Noise. Peaked at No. 16 on the Adult Contemporary chart.
|-
| "Just Put a Ribbon in Your Hair"
| Alan Jackson
| 2004
| From the various artists album A Very Special Acoustic Christmas.
|-
| "The Kid"
| Clint Black
| 1995
| Peaked at No. 71 on the Billboard Hot Country Singles & Tracks chart in 1996, at No. 67 on the same chart in 1999, and at No. 71 on the same chart in 2000. Taken from Black's 1995 holiday album, Looking for Christmas.
|-
| "The Kid in Me"
| Craig Morgan
| 2000
| Peaked at No. 68 on the Billboard Hot Country Singles & Tracks chart.
|-
| "A Kiss for Christmas (O Tannenbaum)"
| Joe Dowell
| 1961
| New lyrics set to the melody of an old German folk song. Peaked at No. 110 on the Billboard Bubbling Under Hot 100 Singles chart.
|-
| "Kissin' by the Mistletoe"
| Aretha Franklin
| 1961
| Appeared in the "Music Vendor" Christmas chart of 1963.
|-
| rowspan=7|"Last Christmas"
| Wham!
| 1984
| Written by George Michael and first released in the United Kingdom on December 3, 1984. First released in the United States as the final track on Wham!'s 1986 studio album, Music from the Edge of Heaven. Made its first appearance on a U.S. music chart on Billboard Hot 100 Airplay chart on the week ending January 3, 1998, peaking at No. 58 one week later (the same week it also entered and peaked at No. 22 on Billboard Adult Contemporary chart). First entered Billboard main Hot 100 chart at No. 50 on the week ending January 7, 2017, eventually peaking at No. 4 on the week ending January 7, 2023 (following its sixth chart re-entry). Also made these other Billboard music charts (with peak positions shown): Adult Pop Airplay (No. 40), Digital Song Sales (No. 11), Global 200 (No. 2), Global 200 Excl. US (No. 2), Greatest of All Time Holiday 100 Songs (No. 8), Holiday 100 (No. 3), Holiday Airplay (No. 4), Holiday Digital Song Sales (No. 2), Holiday Streaming Songs (No. 3), Hot 100 Recurrents (No. 3), LyricFind Global (No. 1), LyricFind U.S. (No. 3), Radio Songs (No. 31), and Streaming Songs (No. 3). Rumored to have been written for Easter, but later changed to Christmas to boost sales.
|-
| Ashley Tisdale
| 2006
| Peaked at No. 47 on the Billboard Holiday Digital Song Sales chart on the week ending November 26, 2011.
|-
| Taylor Swift
| 2007
| Peaked at No. 28 on the Billboard Hot Country Songs chart on the week ending January 5, 2008, at No. 18 on the Billboard Holiday 100 chart on the week ending January 7, 2012, at No. 7 on the Billboard Holiday Digital Song Sales chart on the week ending January 12, 2013, and at No. 12 on the Billboard Holiday Airplay chart on the week ending January 10, 2015.
|-
| Glee Cast featuring Lea Michele and Cory Monteith
| 2009
| Performed in the 2010 Glee episode "A Very Glee Christmas". First version of song to make the Billboard Hot 100 chart, peaking at No. 63 on the week ending December 19, 2009. Also peaked at No. 3 on the Billboard Holiday Digital Songs chart on the week ending January 8, 2011, and at No. 27 on the Billboard Adult Contemporary chart on the week ending December 26, 2009.
|-
| Ariana Grande
| 2013
| Peaked at No. 1 on the Billboard Holiday Digital Song Sales chart on the week ending December 7, 2013, at No. 32 on the Billboard Holiday 100 chart on the week ending December 14, 2013, at No. 22 on the Billboard Holiday Streaming Songs chart on the week ending December 14, 2013, at No. 26 on the Billboard Adult Contemporary chart on the week ending January 4, 2014, and at No. 96 on the Billboard Hot 100 chart on the week ending December 7, 2013.
|-
| Carly Rae Jepsen
| 2015
| Debuted and peaked at No. 43 on Billboard Holiday Digital Song Sales chart on the week ending December 12, 2015.
|-
| Lauren Spencer-Smith
| 2022
| Peaked at No. 49 on Billboard Holiday 100 chart on the week ending January 7, 2023. Also debuted and peaked at No. 43 Billboard Holiday Streaming Songs chart on the week ending December 10, 2022.
|-
| "Leroy the Redneck Reindeer"
| Joe Diffie
| 1995
| Reached No. 33 on the Country charts in 1996. From the album Mr. Christmas.
|-
| "Let It Be Christmas"
| Alan Jackson
| 2002
| Reached No. 37 on the Billboard Hot Country Singles chart in 2002. From the album Let It Be Christmas.
|-
| "Let It Snow"
| Boyz II Men
| 1993
| Co-written and co-produced by R&B singer Brian McKnight, who also provides guest vocals on the track. Not the same song as "Let It Snow! Let It Snow! Let It Snow!".
|-
| rowspan=15|"Let It Snow! Let It Snow! Let It Snow!"
| Vaughn Monroe and His Orchestra
| 1945
| Featuring backing vocals by the Norton Sisters. Spent six weeks at No. 1 on the Billboard Records Most-Played On The Air chart, five weeks at No. 1 on the Billboard Best-Selling Popular Retail Records chart, and five weeks at No. 1 on the Billboard Most-Played Juke Box Records chart in January and February 1946. Written by Sammy Cahn and Jule Styne.
|-
| Connee Boswell and Russ Morgan and His Orchestra
| 1946
| Peaked at No. 9 on the Billboard Most-Played Juke Box Records chart in late January and early February 1946.
|-
| Bob Crosby and Orchestra
| 1946
| Peaked at No. 14 on the Billboard Most-Played Juke Box Records chart in February 1946.
|-
| Woody Herman and His Orchestra
| 1946
| Peaked at No. 7 on the Billboard Records Most-Played On The Air chart in February 1946.
|-
| Frank Sinatra with The B. Swanson Quartet
| 1950
| Made the following Billboard music charts (with peak positions shown): Holiday 100 (No. 45), Holiday Airplay (No. 30), and Holiday Streaming Songs (No. 23).
|-
| Dean Martin
| 1959
| From Martin's 1959 album, A Winter Romance (with orchestra conducted by Gus Levene). First entered Billboard Hot 100 chart on the week ending December 15, 2018, peaking at No. 8 on the week ending January 2, 2021 (following its second chart re-entry). Also made these other Billboard music charts (with peak positions shown): Global 200 (No. 11), Global 200 Excl. US (No. 13), Holiday 100 (No. 6), Holiday Airplay (No. 7), Holiday Digital Song Sales (No. 9), Holiday Streaming Songs (No. 5), Radio Songs (No. 35), and Streaming Songs (No. 5).
|-
| Ricochet
| 1996
| Peaked at No. 39 on the Billboard Hot Country Singles & Tracks chart on the week ending January 8, 2000.
|-
| Martina McBride
| 1998
| Peaked at No. 64 on the Billboard Hot Country Singles & Tracks chart on the week ending January 9, 1999
|-
| George Strait
| 1999
| Peaked at No. 72 on the Billboard Hot Country Singles & Tracks chart on the week ending December 18, 1999.
|-
| Carly Simon
| 2005
| Peaked at No. 6 on the Billboard Adult Contemporary chart on the week ending December 24, 2005.
|-
| Mannheim Steamroller 
| 2007
| Peaked at No. 26 on the Billboard Adult Contemporary chart on the week ending December 29, 2007.
|-
| Rod Stewart
| 2012
| Spent five weeks at No. 1 on the Billboard Adult Contemporary chart in December 2012 into early January 2013.
|-
| India Arie & Joe Sample
| 2015
| Peaked at No. 16 on the Billboard Adult Contemporary chart on the week ending December 26, 2015.
|-
| Pentatonix
| 2017
| Peaked at No. 17 on the Billboard Adult Contemporary chart on the week ending January 3, 2018.
|-
| Seal
| 2017
| Peaked at No. 11 on the Billboard Adult Contemporary chart on the week ending December 23, 2017.
|-
| "Let's Light the Christmas Tree"
| Ruby Wright
| 1957
| Hit various pop charts in Billboard and Music Vendor.
|-
| "Let's Make a Baby King"
| Wynonna Judd
| 1994
| From the album Tell Me Why.
|-
| "Let's Make Christmas Mean Something This Year"
| James Brown
| 1967
| Peaked at #13 on Billboard's Christmas Chart 12/9/1967.  Narrated by Brown, with female backing vocals by The Charmaines  From the album James Brown Sings Christmas Songs.
|-
| "Let's Make Christmas Merry, Baby"
| Amos Milburn and his Aladdin Chicken-Shackers
| 1949
| A hit on Billboard magazine's R&B Best Seller and Juke Box singles chart in 1949.CD liner notes: Billboard Greatest R&B Christmas Hits, 1990 Rhino Records
|-
| "Let's Start the New Year Right"
| Bing Crosby
| 1943
| With the Bob Crosby orchestra. From the 1942 film Holiday Inn.
|-
| "Let the Season Take Wing"
| Amy Grant
| 1992
| Single available only as a cassette. Packaged with the Amy Grant album Home For Christmas at Target stores in 1992.
|-
| "Light of the Stable"
| Emmylou Harris
| 1975
| Featuring backing vocals by Dolly Parton, Linda Ronstadt and Neil Young.
|-
| "Like It's Christmas"
| Jonas Brothers
| 2019
| Peaked at No. 1 on the Billboard Adult Contemporary chart for three straight weeks in December 2019. Also peaked at No. 44 on the Billboard Hot 100 chart in late December 2019/early January 2020.
|-
| "Li'l Elfy"
| Ray Bolger
| 1963
| With the Gene Garf orchestra; charted for one week on the Billboard Christmas charts peaking at #10.
|-
| "Linus and Lucy (Peanuts Theme)"
| Vince Guaraldi Trio
| 1964
| From the 1964 album Jazz Impressions of A Boy Named Charlie Brown. Also included on the soundtrack album to the 1965 animated holiday television special, A Charlie Brown Christmas. First entered Billboard Holiday 100 chart on the week ending December 8, 2012, peaking at No. 17 one week later. Also debuted and peaked at No. 37 on Billboard main Hot 100 chart on the week ending January 1, 2022. Also made these other Billboard music charts (with peak positions shown): Greatest of All Time Holiday 100 Songs (No. 34), Holiday Airplay (No. 10), Holiday Streaming Songs (No. 30), Hot 100 Recurrents (No. 1), Radio Songs (No. 45), and Streaming Songs (No. 35).
|-
| "Little Altar Boy"
| Vic Dana
| 1961
| With the Hank Levine orchestra. Charted again in 1965. Not explicitly a Christmas song, its inclusion on Christmas albums by Jack Jones, Andy Williams, Glen Campbell and (posthumously) the Carpenters established it as a Christmas song.
|-
| "Little Becky's Christmas Wish"
| Becky Lamb
| 1967
| Spoken-word record featuring a little girl who narrates a letter to Santa Claus about her brother Tommy, who is killed in Vietnam. Quite controversial at the time, the record went to No. 2 on the Billboard Christmas chart despite the fact many radio stations refused to play it. Little is known about Becky except for the fact that she was five years old at the time of the recording; the B-side, "Go to Sleep Little Lambs" is credited to Bill Lamb, presumably Becky's father.
|-
| "The Little Boy that Santa Claus Forgot"
| Vera Lynn
| 1937
| Covered by Nat King Cole in 1953. Sung on-screen by James Belushi in film Jingle All The Way.
|-
|rowspan="9" | " (Carol of the Drum)"
|  Chorale
| 1958
| Written in 1941 by Katherine K. Davis. Harry Simeone's was the first to chart the song peaking at #13 on the Hot 100.  The single went on to peak at #1 for 10 weeks on Billboard's Christmas Record chart.  It peaked at #10 on the Holiday Song chart in 2005 and at #25 on the Holiday 100 in 2007. Released as part of a medley by The Ray Conniff Singers in 1962.  "Jolly Old St. Nicholas/Little Drummer Boy" peaked Billboard's Holiday Song chart at #19 in 2005.  Other charted versions include RuPaul (1994), Restless Heart (1999), Josh Groban (2007), Wilson Phillips (2010), Richard Marx (2012), and for KING & COUNTRY (2017). A version by the Vienna Boys Choir also hit big when it was featured in the Rankin/Bass animated TV special of the same name.
|-
| 
| 1959
| Peaked at #63 on Billboard's Hot 100.  
|-
| 
| 1963
| Peaked at #46 on the Holiday 100 in 2019. Crosby also recorded the medley "Peace On Earth/Little Drummer Boy" with David Bowie in 1977.
|-
|
| 1963
| From his 1963 album Sounds of Christmas. Peaked at #11 on Billboard's Christmas Records chart.  
|-
|
| 1966
|From her album Noël.  The single peaked at #16 for 3 weeks on Billboard's Best Bets For Christmas 
|-
|
| 1966
| Peaked at #21 on Billboard's Best Bets For Christmas in 1967. 
|-
|
| 1967
|Peaked at No. 2 for 2 weeks on Billboard magazine's special Christmas Singles chart in 1967 (it charted again in 1969).
|-
| & The Silver Bullet Band
| 1987
| His version from the multi-artist A Very Special Christmas peaked at No. 42 on Billboard magazine's Holiday Songs in 2005.
|-
| Pentatonix 
| 2013
| Peaked at #1 on the Holiday 100. 
|-
| "Little Saint Nick"
| The Beach Boys
| 1963
| Written by Brian Wilson and Mike Love. Peaked at No. 3 on the Billboard Christmas Singles chart on the week ending December 28, 1963 (making this same chart again in 1964). First entered Billboard main Hot 100 chart on the week ending January 2, 2021, peaking at No. 29 on the week ending January 7, 2023 (one week after its second chart re-entry). Also made these other Billboard music charts (with peak positions shown): Digital Song Sales (No. 63), Global 200 (No. 41), Global 200 Excl. US (No. 101), Greatest of All Time Holiday 100 Songs (No. 35), Holiday 100 (No. 22), Holiday Airplay (No. 14), Holiday Digital Song Sales (No. 9), Holiday Streaming Songs (No. 20), Hot 100 Recurrents (No. 3), and Streaming Songs (No. 21).
|-
| "Little Sandy Sleighfoot"
| Jimmy Dean
| 1957
| Novelty song performed with the Ray Ellis Orchestra.
|-
| "Lonesome Christmas"
| Lowell Fulson
| 1950
| Originally charted on the R&B charts, hit the Christmas singles chart in 1964–1968 and 1970.
|-
| "Love For Christmas"
| Felix Gross and his Orchestra
| 1949
| Reached No. 9 on the Hot R&B Singles chart. Featured Tiny Webb on guitar and Joe Howard on tenor sax.
|-
| "Love Is"
| Leza Miller
| 1967
| Charted for 2 weeks on the Christmas Singles chart, peaking at No. 20. B-side is "Loneliest Christmas Tree".
|-
| "Love on Layaway"
| Gloria Estefan
| 2000
| Included on the 2001 album Now That's What I Call Christmas!.
|-
| "Macarena Christmas"
| Los del Río
| 1996
| Dance record "Macarena", mixed with a melody of holiday songs, including "Joy to the World", "Jingle Bells", "Silent Night", "Rudolph the Red-Nosed Reindeer", "White Christmas", and "Auld Lang Syne".
|-
| "The Man with All the Toys"
| The Beach Boys
| 1964
| Reached No. 6 on the Billboard Christmas chart in 1964.
|-
| "Marshmallow World"
| Bing Crosby
| 1950
| Lyrics written by Carl Sigman and music composed by Peter De Rose. Also recorded by Darlene Love for the classic 1963 holiday album A Christmas Gift for You from Phil Spector. Other popular versions recorded by Brenda Lee in 1964 and Dean Martin in 1966.
|-
| "The Marvelous Toy"
| Chad Mitchell Trio
| 1963
| Written by Tom Paxton. Peter, Paul & Mary released a version in 1969. A folk favorite, also recorded by The Irish Rovers and John Denver.
|-
| "Mary, Did You Know"
| Kenny Rogers with Wynonna
| 1996
| Lyrics written in 1984 by Mark Lowry. Buddy Greene composed the music in 1990. The song was first released on the album Michael English in 1992. Also a hit for Kathy Mattea (1993), Natalie Cole (1999), Reba McEntire (1999), Clay Aiken (2005), Michael Bublé, Pentatonix (2014), Jordan Smith, and others.
|-
| "Mary's Boy Child"
| Harry Belafonte
| 1956
| Written by Jester Hairston. Also a top 40 hit remake in the UK for Nina & Frederick in 1959, and a No. 1 hit remake in the UK for Boney M in 1978, as a medley titled "Mary's Boy Child/Oh My Lord".
|-
| "May Christmas Bring You Happiness"
| Luther
| 1976
| 1970s R&B vocal quintet featuring Luther Vandross on lead vocals, along with former Shades of Jade members Anthony Hinton and Diane Sumler, Theresa V. Reed, and Christine Wiltshire.
|-
| "May You Always"
| Harry Harrison
| 1965
| Spoken-word recording accompanied by "Auld Lang Syne" as its instrumental backing that peaked at No. 26 on Billboard Top Christmas Singles chart on the week ending December 25, 1965. Not to be confused with the popular song of the same title. Harrison was a New York City-based radio personality and disc jockey.
|-
| rowspan=2|"Mele Kalikimaka (Merry Christmas)"
| Bing Crosby with The Andrews Sisters
| 1950
| This Hawaiian-themed Christmas song debuted on Billboard Hot 100 chart at No. 36 on the week ending January 2, 2021. Also made these other Billboard music charts (with peak positions shown): Digital Song Sales (No. 47), Holiday 100 (No. 25), Holiday Digital Song Sales (No. 22), Holiday Streaming Songs (No. 22), Hot 100 Recurrents (No. 5), and Streaming Songs (No. 22).
|-
| Jimmy Buffett
| 1996
| Peaked at No. 12 on Billboard Holiday Digital Song Sales chart on the week ending December 25, 2010.
|-
| "Merry Christmas" (1)
| Judy Garland
| 1949
| Written by Janice Torre and Fred Spielman, for the 1949 MGM musical film In the Good Old Summertime. Later recorded by Johnny Mathis (2002) and Bette Midler (2006).
|-
| "Merry Christmas" (2)
| Ed Sheeran & Elton John
| 2021
| Written by Sheeran and John. Peaked at No. 1 for one week on Billboard Adult Contemporary chart on the week ending January 1, 2022, and at No. 42 on Billboard main Hot 100 chart on the week ending December 31, 2022 (upon its chart re-entry). Also made these other Billboard music charts (with peak positions shown): Adult Pop Airplay (No. 25), Digital Song Sales (No. 4), Global 200 (No. 15), Global 200 Excl. US (No. 7), Holiday 100 (No. 29), Holiday Digital Song Sales (No. 2), Holiday Streaming Songs (No. 28), LyricFind Global (No. 7), LyricFind U.S. (No. 25), Pop Airplay (No. 36), Streaming Songs (No. 34), and Top Triller U.S. (No. 20).
|-
| "Merry Christmas (I Don't Want to Fight Tonight)"
| The Ramones
| 1987
| B-side of single "I Wanna Live".
|-
| "Merry Christmas, Baby"
| Johnny Moore's Three Blazers
| 1947
| The original version by Johnny Moore's Three Blazers peaked at No. 3 on Billboard magazine's R&B Juke Box chart during the Christmas season of 1947. Charles Brown was the singer and pianist of Johnny Moore's Three Blazers. Brown also recorded a hit solo remake of the song in 1956 and again in 1968. Other versions that also charted were by Chuck Berry in 1958, and by Otis Redding in 1968. Bruce Springsteen also recorded a live version from a 1980 concert (first released in 1986 as a B-side) that was made popular following its inclusion on the 1987 Special Olympics charity album A Very Special Christmas.
|-
| "Merry Christmas Darling"
| The Carpenters
| 1970
| Re-charted in 1971, 1972, 1973, and 1983. Re-released in 1978 with newly recorded vocals for their 1978 holiday album Christmas Portrait. Also a hit for Vanessa L. Williams in 2004.
|-
| "Merry Christmas Everybody"
| Train
| 2015
| Peaked at No. 10 on the Billboard Adult Contemporary chart. First recorded by the English rock band Slade in 1973.
|-
| "Merry Christmas from the Family"
| Robert Earl Keen
| 1994
| From the album Gringo Honeymoon. A version by Montgomery Gentry also charted at No. 38 on Hot Country Songs in 2001.
|-
| "Merry Christmas, Happy Holidays"
| 'N Sync
| 1998
| Hit the Top 40 Mainstream chart in 1999.
|-
| "Merry Christmas in the NFL"
| Buckner & Garcia
| 1980
| Novelty song which imagined Howard Cosell as Santa Claus. Performed under the pseudonym "Willis the Guard & Vigorish", the song reached No. 82 on the Billboard charts, despite limited airplay after Cosell found the song offensive.
|-
| "Merry Christmas Strait to You"
| George Strait
| 1986
| First released on Strait's 1986 holiday album Merry Christmas Strait to You, but the title track didn't hit the Billboard Hot Country Singles chart until 1998.
|-
| "Merry Merry Christmas Baby"
| Dodie Stevens
| 1960
| Covered by Margo Sylvia in 1994.
|-
| "Merry Merry Merry Frickin' Christmas"
| Frickin' A
| 2004
| Two versions of the song. One is a tribute to the Boston Red Sox on their winning of the 2004 World Series. The other is a satire of spending time with the family.
|-
| "Merry Twistmas"
| The Marcels
| 1961
| Written to capitalize on the U.S. dance craze called "The Twist".
|-
| "Mistletoe" (1)
| Colbie Caillat
| 2007
| Peaked at No. 75 on the Billboard Hot 100 singles chart and No. 44 on the Billboard Pop 100 chart in late 2007, and No. 7 on the Billboard Hot Adult Contemporary Tracks chart in early 2008.
|-
| "Mistletoe" (2)
| Justin Bieber
| 2011
| Peaked at No. 11 on the Billboard Hot 100 singles chart, No. 5 on Billboard Hot Digital Songs chart in 2011. Also peaked at No. 4 on Billboard Adult Contemporary Tracks.
|-
| "Mistletoe and Holly"
| Frank Sinatra
| 1957
| Written by Frank Sinatra, Doc Stanford & Hank Sanicola. Selected as the theme song for the 1960 Christmas Seals appeal.
|-
| "The Mistletoe and Me"
| Isaac Hayes
| 1969
| Charted again in 1973.
|-
| "Monsters' Holiday"
| Bobby (Boris) Pickett and the Crypt-Kickers
| 1962
| Similar to Pickett's No. 1 pop hit single from earlier in 1962, "Monster Mash".  Peaked at #30 on the Hot 100.
|-
| "The More You Give (The More You'll Have)"
| Michael Bublé
| 2015
| Peaked at No. 19 on the Billboard Adult Contemporary chart in early 2016.
|-
| "Mr. Hankey the Christmas Poo"
| South Park
| 1997
| Song debuted in the South Park episode of the same name, has appeared in several others since.
|-
| "Must Be Santa"
| Lorne Greene with the Jimmy Joyce Children's Choir
| 1966
| Written by Hal Moore and Bill Fredricks. First recorded by Mitch Miller and the Gang in 1961. Also covered by Bob Dylan in 2009.
|-
| "My Boyfriend's Coming Home for Christmas"
| Toni Wine
| 1963
| Includes elements of "The First Noel".  Charted one week on Billboard's Christmas Records Chart peaking at #22. 
|-
| "My Christmas Card to You"
| The Partridge Family
| 1971
| Written by Tony Romeo. From the Billboard #1 Christmas album of 1971 A Partridge Family Christmas Card.
|-
| "My Favorite Things"
| Herb Alpert & the Tijuana Brass
| 1968
| Originally written for the 1959 Broadway musical The Sound of Music. Charted for Herb Alpert and the Tijuana Brass, reaching No. 7 on the Billboard Easy Listening chart, #35 on the Cash Box Top 100, and #45 on the Billboard Hot 100 in early 1969. Popular versions that charted include a minor hit for Lorrie Morgan in 1994, a version by the band Chicago in 2001, and Kenny G in 2005.
|-
| "My Mom and Santa Claus"
| George Jones
| 1965
| First released in 1962; charted for one week on the Billboard Christmas charts in 1965.
|-
| "My Only Wish (This Year)"
| Britney Spears
| 2000
| Reached No. 7 on the Christmas Songs chart.
|-
| "Natividad (Nativity)"
| Harvie June Van
| 1967
| First released on Briar Records in 1962. Re-issue on Kapp Records peaked at No. 15 on Billboard's Christmas Singles chart.
|-
| "New Year's Eve 1999"
| Alabama with Gretchen Peters
| 1999
| Peaked at No. 55 on Billboard Hot Country Singles & Tracks chart in early 2000.
|-
| "A New York Christmas"
| Rob Thomas
| 2003
| Peaked at No. 22 on Billboard Hot 100 Singles Sales chart.
|-
| "The Night Before Christmas" (1)
| Milton Cross
| 1939
| Peaked at No. 6 on Billboard Best-Selling Children's Records chart in 1948. Recitation of Clement Moore's famous 1823 poem "A Visit from St. Nicholas" with musical background orchestrated by Victor Salon. Originally released in 1939. A version by Jim Brickman featuring John Oates peaked at No. 5 on Billboard's Adult Contemporary chart in 2014.
|-
| "The Night Before Christmas" (2)
| Carly Simon
| 1992
| Written and recorded by Simon for the 1992 film This Is My Life; also used in the 1994 film Mixed Nuts. Covered by Amy Grant in 1992.
|-
| "The Night Before Christmas Song"
| Rosemary Clooney & Gene Autry
| 1952
| Peaked at No. 9 on Billboard Top Popular Records – Most Played by Jockeys chart in late December 1952. A recording of Clement Moore's famous 1823 poem "A Visit from St. Nicholas" featuring a melody written by Johnny Marks and orchestration by Carl Cotner.
|-
| "The Night Santa Went Crazy"
| "Weird Al" Yankovic
| 1996
| Parody of Greg Lake's "I Believe in Father Christmas" in the style of Soul Asylum's "Black Gold". Two versions were recorded.
|-
| ""
| Shiloh
| 2010
| The late Dan Adkins collaborated in writing the song, "The Night Was Anything But Silent." It was later recorded by Jonathan White and Shiloh. The latter group also recorded a Latin version.
|-
| "Nina-Non"
| Joni James
| 1953
| Featuring orchestra and chorus conducted by Lew Douglas.
|-
| "A Not So Merry Christmas"
| Bobby Vee
| 1962
| From the album Merry Christmas from Bobby Vee.
|-
| "The Nutcracker Suite"
| Arthur Fiedler and the Boston Pops
| 1958
| Also a hit for the Berlin Symphony Orchestra and many others around the world. Introduced in a stylized jazz-big band version by Les Brown in the 1957 album Concert Modern. Other hit rock versions by The Brian Setzer Orchestra and Trans-Siberian Orchestra. Latter's version retitled "A Mad Russian's Christmas".
|-
| "Nuttin' for Christmas"
| Art Mooney and His OrchestraVocal by Barry Gordon
| 1955
| Peaked at No. 6 on Billboard Popular Records – Best Sellers in Stores chart in 1956. Versions by four other artists charted in December 1955 and early 1956 on one or more of Billboard music popularity charts: Joe Ward, Ricky Zahnd & The Blue Jeaners (titled "(I'm Gettin') Nuttin' for Christmas"), The Fontane Sisters, and Stan Freberg. Written by Sid Tepper and Roy C. Bennett. Eartha Kitt released a version in 1955 with different lyrics titled "Nothin' for Christmas" with the same writer credits. Also covered by the rock group Smash Mouth.
|-
| "O Bambino (One Cold and Blessed Winter)"
| Harry Simeone Chorale
| 1964
| Peaked at No. 9 on Billboard's Christmas Singles chart. Charted again on the Christmas Singles chart and Billboard Bubbling Under Hot 100 Singles chart in 1965. Introduced in 1961 by The Springfields as "Bambino (Napoli Lullaby)". Same melody as "Bagpiper's Carol" by The Mariners.
|-
| "O Come All Ye Faithful"
| Twisted Sister
| 2006
| Performed in the style of their hit "We're Not Gonna Take It", while staying faithful to the carol's original words and melody.
|-
| "O Holy Night"
| John Berry
| 1995
| Peaked at No. 55 on Billboard Hot Country Singles & Tracks chart in 1996. A 19th-century French carol, originally titled "Cantique de Noël." First known recorded version was released in 1916 by Enrico Caruso. First appearance on a popular Christmas album was in 1946 by Fred Waring. Other charted versions were by Mariah Carey (1994), Martina McBride (1996), Celine Dion (1998), Josh Groban (2002), LeAnn Rimes (2003), Clay Aiken (2004), Carrie Underwood (2009), Newsboys (2010), and Richard Marx (2012). Dion's version was featured as the leading song to her popular 1998 album These Are Special Times.
|-
| "O Little Town Of Bethlehem"
| Jo Stafford
| 1964
| On her album, "The Joyful Season", it features Stafford accompanying herself as a vocal choir through the use of multitrack recording.
|-
| "O Tannenbaum"
| Vince Guaraldi Trio
| 1965
| Lyrics composed in 1824 by Ernst Anschütz. Recorded by Guaraldi for the soundtrack album to the 1965 animated holiday television special, A Charlie Brown Christmas. First entered Billboard Holiday 100 chart on the week ending December 10, 2011, peaking at No. 29 on the week ending January 5, 2019. Also made these other Billboard music charts (with peak positions shown): Global 200 (No. 161), Greatest of All Time Holiday 100 Songs (No. 66), Holiday Airplay (No. 27), Holiday Streaming Songs (No. 26), Hot 100 Recurrents (No. 14), and Streaming Songs (No. 41).
|-
| rowspan=2|"Oh Santa!"
| Mariah Carey
| 2010
| First single released from Carey's second holiday album, Merry Christmas II You. Spent four weeks at No. 1 on Billboard Adult Contemporary chart in December 2010 and early 2011. Debuted at No. 1 on Billboard Holiday Digital Songs chart on the week ending October 30, 2010.
|-
| Mariah Carey Featuring Ariana Grande & Jennifer Hudson
| 2020
| New version of Carey's 2010 single released on the soundtrack to Mariah Carey's Magical Christmas Special. Made these Billboard music charts (with peak positions shown): Adult Contemporary (No. 17), Digital Song Sales (No. 3), Hot 100 (No. 76), Holiday 100 (No. 45), Holiday Digital Song Sales (No. 1), Hot R&B/Hip-Hop Songs (No. 20), R&B Digital Song Sales (No. 1), R&B Songs (No. 4), R&B Streaming Songs (No. 15), and R&B/Hip-Hop Digital Song Sales (No. 1).
|-
| "Oi to the World"
| The Vandals
| 1996
| Covered by No Doubt in 1997.
|-
| "An Old Christmas Card"
| Jim Reeves
| 1963
| From the album Twelve Songs of Christmas. Reached the Music Vendor Christmas chart the same year.
|-
| "The Old Man's Back in Town"
| Garth Brooks
| 1992
| Peaked at No. 48 on Billboard Hot Country Singles & Tracks chart in 1993 (charted again on the same Billboard chart in 1998, peaking at No. 59). Included on Brooks's first holiday album, Beyond the Season.
|-
| "Old Time Christmas"
| George Strait
| 1999
| Peaked at No. 62 on Billboard Hot Country Singles & Tracks chart in 2000.
|-
| "Old Toy Trains"
| Roger Miller
| 1967
| Peaked at No. 13 on Billboard Christmas Singles chart. A 2000 version by Toby Keith peaked at No. 57 on Billboard Hot Country Singles & Tracks chart in early 2001.
|-
| "One Wish (for Christmas)"
| Whitney Houston
| 2003
| Peaked at No. 23 on Billboard Hot Adult Contemporary chart in 2004. Originally recorded by Freddie Jackson and included on his 1994 holiday album, Freddie Jackson at Christmas.
|-
| "Our Winter Love"
| Bill Pursell
| 1963
| Instrumental track that peaked at No. 9 on the Billboard Hot 100 singles chart and at No. 4 on Billboard Middle-Road Singles chart in late March 1963, and at No. 20 on Billboard Hot R&B Singles chart in April 1963. A vocal version by The Lettermen peaked at No. 16 on Billboard Top 40 Easy Listening chart and No. 72 on Billboard Hot 100 singles chart in February 1967.
|-
| "Paper Angels"
| Jimmy Wayne
| 2003
| Peaked at No. 18 on Billboard's Hot Country Singles & Tracks chart in early 2004.
|-
| "Parade of the Wooden Soldiers"
| Vincent Lopez Orchestra
| 1922
| The Vincent Lopez Orchestra version peaked at No. 3 on the pop singles chart in September 1922. Other charted versions include Carl Fenton's Orchestra (1922), and Paul Whiteman and His Orchestra (1923). Music written in 1897 by Leon Jessel and popularized by Nikita Balieff's 1920s musical revue La Chauve-Souris. A version by The Crystals was also included on Phil Spector's 1963 holiday album, A Christmas Gift for You from Philles Records.
|-
| "Peace on Earth/Little Drummer Boy"
| David Bowie & Bing Crosby
| 1982
| Originally performed on September 11, 1977, for Crosby's final holiday television special, Bing Crosby's Merrie Olde Christmas, and first released as a single in 1982. Appeared on Billboard Hot 100 Singles Sales chart in 2000, 2001, 2003 and 2004, peaking at No. 43. A video clip of the performance from the Crosby television special became a holiday staple on MTV during the holiday season for much of the 1980s.
|-
| "Pick Out a Christmas Tree"
| Dan + Shay
| 2021
| Peaked at No. 77 on the Billboard Hot 100 chart and at No. 11 on the Billboard Hot Country Songs chart in December 2021. Also made these other Billboard music charts (with peak positions shown): Country Streaming Songs (No. 7), Holiday 100 (No. 46), and Holiday Streaming Songs (No. 33).
|-
| rowspan=9|"Please Come Home for Christmas"
| Charles Brown
| 1960
| Peaked at No. 21 on Billboard Hot R&B Sides chart on the week ending January 8, 1961, and at No. 76 on Billboard Hot 100 chart on the week ending January 7, 1962. Also made Billboard Christmas Singles chart each December from 1963 to 1970 and again in both 1972 and 1973, peaking at No. 1 on the week ending December 16, 1972. Written by Brown and Gene Redd.
|-
| The Uniques
| 1967
| Peaked at No. 32 on Billboard Christmas Singles chart on the week ending December 23, 1967.
|-
| Eagles
| 1978
| Peaked at No. 18 on Billboard Hot 100 chart on the week ending January 6, 1979, and at No. 15 on Billboard Adult Contemporary chart on the week ending January 10, 1998. Also made these other Billboard music charts (with peak positions shown): Adult Pop Airplay (No. 31), Digital Song Sales (No. 74), Global 200 (No. 57), Global 200 Excl. US (No. 92), Heritage Rock (No. 37), Holiday 100 (No. 18), Holiday Airplay (No. 2), Holiday Digital Song Sales (No. 29), Holiday Streaming Songs (No. 24), Hot 100 Recurrents (No. 4), Rock Digital Song Sales (No. 11), Rock Streaming Songs (No. 3), and Streaming Songs (No. 37).
|-
| Gary Allan
| 1996
| Debuted and peaked at No. 70 on Billboard Hot Country Singles & Tracks chart on the week ending January 11, 1997.
|-
| Lee Roy Parnell
| 1996
| Debuted and peaked at No. 71 on Billboard Hot Country Singles & Tracks chart on the week ending January 11, 1997.
|-
| Willie Nelson
| 2003
| Debuted and peaked at No. 50 on Billboard Hot Country Singles & Tracks chart on the week ending January 3, 2004.
|-
| Josh Gracin
| 2005
| Debuted and peaked at No. 51 on Billboard Hot Country Songs chart on the week ending January 7, 2006.
|-
| Martina McBride
| 2011
| Debuted and peaked at No. 51 on Billboard Hot Country Songs chart on the week ending January 7, 2012.
|-
| Kelly Clarkson
| 2013
| Peaked at No. 6 on Billboard Adult Contemporary chart on the week ending January 4, 2014, and at No. 14 on Billboard Holiday Digital Song Sales chart on the week ending November 16, 2013.
|-
| "Please, Daddy (Don't Get Drunk This Christmas)"
| John Denver
| 1973
| Peaked at No. 7 on Billboard Christmas Singles chart in 1973, and at No. 69 on both the Billboard Hot 100 singles and Billboard Hot Country Singles charts in early 1974. Written by Bill Danoff and Taffy Nivert. Recorded for Denver's Farewell Andromeda album; on original LP and single releases the song's title was displayed as simply "Please, Daddy". Re-recorded for Denver's Rocky Mountain Christmas album in 1975. The song has been covered by other artists, such as Alan Jackson (1993) and The Decemberists (2006).
|-
| "Please Uncle Sam (Send Back My Man)"
| The Charmels
| 1966
| An early Stax/Volt single, in which a lonely Christmas is expected due to the singer's lover being in Vietnam.
|-
| "Po' Folks' Christmas"
| Bill Anderson and The Po' Boys
| 1968
| Peaked at No. 18 on Billboard Christmas Singles chart.
|-
| "Presents for Christmas"
| Solomon Burke
| 1968
| Released on the 1968 various artists holiday soul album Soul Christmas.
|-
| "Pretty Paper"
| Roy Orbison
| 1963
| Peaked at No. 15 on the Billboard Hot 100 singles chart and No. 10 on Billboard Middle-Road Singles chart in 1964. Also charted on Billboard Christmas Singles chart, peaking at No. 27. Written by Willie Nelson. The original recording by Orbison was arranged by Bill Justis, with orchestra and chorus conducted by Ivor Raymonde. A 2003 version by Kenny Chesney featuring Willie Nelson peaked at No. 45 on Billboard Hot Country Singles & Tracks chart in 2004. Nelson himself released two versions: his original 1964 version (for RCA Records) and a re-recording in 1979 as the title track of his holiday album released that year.
|-
| "Put a Little Holiday in Your Heart"
| LeAnn Rimes
| 1996
| Peaked at No. 51 on Billboard Hot Country Singles & Tracks chart in 1997. Single available only as a bonus CD with the purchase of Rimes's 1996 studio album Blue at Target stores during the 1996 holiday season.
|-
| "Put Christ Back Into Christmas"
| Red Foley with The Anita Kerr Singers
| 1953
| Peaked at No. 23 on the pop singles chart.
|-
| "The Real Meaning of Christmas"
| Ray Conniff and The Singers
| 1965
| Peaked at No. 19 on Billboard's Christmas Singles chart.
|-
| "Redneck 12 Days of Christmas"
| Jeff Foxworthy
| 1995
| Peaked at No. 18 on Billboard Hot Country Singles & Tracks chart in 1996. Parody of the traditional English song "Twelve Days of Christmas". A 2000 cover version by the Redneck Carollers also featured Foxworthy on lead vocals.
|-
| "Reindeer Boogie"
| Trisha Yearwood
| 1994
| Peaked at No. 63 on Billboard Hot Country Singles & Tracks chart in 1999. First recorded by Hank Snow in 1953.
|-
| "Remember Bethlehem"
| Dee Mullins
| 1970
| Peaked at No. 71 on Billboard Hot Country Singles chart in 1971.
|-
| "Ring Out, Solstice Bells"
| Jethro Tull
| 1976
| From the album Songs from the Wood.
|-
| "Ring Those Christmas Bells"
| Peggy Lee
| 1953
| Written by Marvin Fisher and Gus Levene. Also recorded by Lawrence Welk (1957) and Fred Waring (1959).
|-
| "River"
| Barry Manilow
| 2002
| Peaked at No. 17 on Billboard Adult Contemporary chart in 2003, and included on his 2002 holiday album, A Christmas Gift of Love. Also recorded by Sarah McLachlan (2006). Written and originally recorded by Joni Mitchell, whose original version is included on her 1971 non-holiday studio album, Blue.
|-
| "Rock and Roll Christmas"
| George Thorogood & the Destroyers
| 1983
|
|-
| rowspan=4|"Rockin' Around the Christmas Tree"
| Brenda Lee
| 1958
| Written by Johnny Marks. First entered the Billboard Hot 100 singles chart at No. 64 for the week ending December 18, 1960, originally peaking at No. 14 for the week ending January 1, 1961. The single re-entered the Hot 100 chart eight times (in 1961, 1962, 2013, 2015, 2016, 2017, 2018, and 2019), eventually peaking at No. 2 for two weeks on the Hot 100 charts dated December 28, 2019 and January 4, 2020, making it the single with the longest chart run to No. 2 (at 59 years, one week, and three days). The B-side of Lee's original single (Decca 30776) is "Papa Noël", a holiday song written by Roy Botkin.
|-
| Alabama
| 1996
| Peaked at No. 64 on the Billboard Hot Country Singles & Tracks chart on the week ending January 8, 2000.
|-
| LeAnn Rimes
| 2004
| Peaked at No. 3 on the Billboard Adult Contemporary chart on the week ending January 8, 2005, and at No. 30 on the Billboard Holiday Airplay chart on the week ending November 27, 2010.
|-
| MercyMe
| 2005
| Peaked at No. 25 on the Billboard Hot Adult Contemporary chart on the week ending January 7, 2006.
|-
| "Rockin' Little Christmas"
| Carlene Carter
| 1995
| Reached No. 66 on the Hot Country Singles chart. Covered by Brooks & Dunn in 2002.
|-
| "Rudolph, the Red-Nosed Reindeer"
| Gene Autry & the Pinafores
| 1949
| Spent eight weeks at No. 1 on Billboard Children's Records chart from late November 1949 through mid January 1950. Also peaked at No. 1 on both Billboard Best-Selling Pop Singles and Billboard Country & Western Records Most Played by Folk Disk Jockeys charts in early 1950. Autry recorded an updated version of the song in 1957 that featured orchestration by Carl Cotner, which peaked at No. 70 on Billboard Top 100 Sides chart. Covered by many artists through the years, including charted versions by Bing Crosby (1950), Spike Jones and his City Slickers (1950), Red Foley (1951), The Cadillacs (1957), Paul Anka (1960), The Chipmunks (1960), The Temptations (1968), and Alan Jackson (1996).
|-
| rowspan=2|"Run Rudolph Run"
| Chuck Berry
| 1958
| First entered the Billboard Hot 100 singles chart at No. 90 on the week ending December 15, 1958, originally peaking at No. 69 two weeks later. Re-entered the Hot 100 chart at No. 45 on the week ending January 5, 2019, attaining an overall peak position of No. 10 on the week ending January 2, 2021 (following its third chart re-entry). Also made these other Billboard music charts (with peak positions shown): Digital Song Sales (No. 29), Global 200 (No. 22), Global 200 Excl. US (No. 86), Greatest of All Time Holiday 100 Songs (No. 37), Holiday 100 (No. 9), Holiday Airplay (No. 46), Holiday Digital Song Sales (No. 6), Holiday Streaming Songs (No. 6), Hot 100 Recurrents (No. 1), LyricFind U.S. (No. 14), R&B Digital Song Sales (No. 2), R&B Streaming Songs (No. 1), R&B/Hip-Hop Digital Song Sales (No. 4), R&B/Hip-Hop Streaming Songs (No. 1), Rock Digital Song Sales (No. 3), Rock Streaming Songs (No. 1), Streaming Songs (No. 6), and Top Triller U.S. (No. 16). The B-side of Berry's original single is another holiday tune, a cover of "Merry Christmas Baby," which also charted on the Hot 100 in December 1958, peaking at No. 71.
|-
| Luke Bryan
| 2008
| Peaked at No. 42 on the Billboard Hot Country Songs chart on the week ending January 10, 2009.
|-
| "Same Old Lang Syne"
| Dan Fogelberg
| 1980
| Peaked at No. 9 on the Billboard Hot 100 singles chart and No. 8 on Billboard Adult Contemporary chart in February 1981.
|-
| "Santa Baby"
| Eartha Kitt with Henri Rene & His Orchestra
| 1953
| Written by Tony Springer, Phil Springer & Joan Javits. In 1954, Eartha Kitt recorded a new version of the song with new lyrics titled "This Year's Santa Baby", while Homer & Jethro also recorded a version titled "Santy Baby" in 1954. Later covered by Mae West (1966), Madonna (1987), Kylie Minogue (2000), and Kellie Pickler (2007).
|-
| "Santa Baby (Gimme, Gimme, Gimme)"
| Willa Ford
| 2001
| The lead single from the album MTV: TRL Christmas.
|-
| "Santa Bring My Baby Back (To Me)"
| Elvis Presley
| 1957
| Written by Aaron Schroeder and Claude DeMetruis.
|-
| "Santa Claus and His Old Lady"
| Cheech & Chong
| 1971
| Spoken comedy record. Peaked at No. 4 on the Billboard Christmas Singles chart in 1971 (as well as No. 38 on the Billboard Hot 100), and the following year peaked at a new high of No. 3.
|-
| "The Santa Claus Boogie"
| The Tractors
| 1994
| Re-charted on the Hot Country Singles and Hot 100 charts in 1995.
|-
| "Santa Claus Go Straight to the Ghetto"
| James Brown
| 1968
| Recharted in 1969. A new version from the album James Brown's Funky Christmas reached the R&B charts in 1998.
|-
| "Santa Claus Got Stuck in My Chimney"
| Ella Fitzgerald
| 1950
|
|-
| "Santa Claus Is Back in Town"
| Elvis Presley
| 1957
| Written by Jerry Leiber and Mike Stoller. A 1997 version by Dwight Yoakam peaked at No. 60 on Billboard Hot Country Singles & Tracks chart in early 1998.
|-
| "Santa Claus Is Comin' (In a Boogie Woogie Choo Choo Train)"
| The Tractors
| 1995
| Reached No. 43 on the Country charts in 1996. Rewriting of the group's biggest hit, "Baby Likes to Rock It".
|-
| rowspan=9| "Santa Claus Is Coming to Town"
|  and the Hotel Taft Orchestra
| 1934
| Written in 1933 by Haven Gillespie and J. Fred Coots.  George Hall peaked at #12 on Billboard's popular singles chart with his version. Other notable hit versions were by The Crystals (1963), The Carpenters (1975),  George Strait (1995), Lonestar (2000), Barry Manilow (2002) and Harry Connick Jr. (2003),
|-
|  and The Andrews Sisters
| 1947
| The flip side to their "Jingle Bells" peaked at #22 on Billboard's popular singles chart. 
|-
| 
| 1962
| Peaked at #23 on the Hot 100.  
|-
| 
| 1970
| Their version peaked at #22 on the Holiday 100 in 2021.  It originally hit No. 1 for 2 weeks on Billboard's Christmas Singles chart in 1970 and charted again in 1971 and 1973 with the flip side "Christmas Won't Be The Same This Year" also from the Jackson 5 Christmas Album.  
|-
| 
| 1981
| Recorded 'live' December 12, 1975 at C.W. Post College in Greenvale, New York. First released as a promotional single from the album In Harmony 2 in 1981.  Springsteen had released it as the flip side to his 1985 single "My Hometown" when it peaked at #1 on the last Billboard Christmas Hits singles chart on December 28, 1985. The song peaked at #13 on the Holiday Songs chart in 2007.  It has charted every week of the Holiday 100 since 2001 peaking at #16 in 2012. 
|-
|  with Cyndi Lauper
| 1992
| From the album A Very Special Christmas 2.  Peaked at #13 on Billboard's Holiday Songs chart in 2005.  
|-
| 
| 1994
| Peaked at #45 on the Holiday 100 in 2017. 
|-
|  
| 2002
| Peaked at #13 on Billboard's Holiday Songs chart.  
|-
| 
| 2011
| Peaked at #35 on the Holiday 100 in 2012.
|-
| "Santa Claus Is Definitely Here to Stay"
| James Brown
| 1970
| Reached No. 7 on the Christmas Chart in 1970.
|-
| "Santa Claus Is Watching You"
| Ray Stevens
| 1962
| Featuring backing vocals by the Merry Melody Singers.
|-
| "Santa Claus Lane"
| Hilary Duff
| 2002
| Title track from the album Santa Claus Lane. Also used in the movie The Santa Clause 2.
|-
| "Santa Got Lost In Texas"
| Jeff Carson
| 1996
| Based on the melody of "The Eyes of Texas", with lyrics rewritten by Ken Darby. Originally recorded by Michael Landon in 1963 for the album Bonanza: Christmas on the Ponderosa.
|-
| "Santa, I'm Right Here"
| Toby Keith
| 1995
| Peaked at No. 50 on the Billboard Hot Country Singles chart.
|-
| "Santa Looked a Lot Like Daddy"
| Buck Owens
| 1965
| Reached No. 2 on the Pop charts in 1965. Charted again by Buck Owens in 1967, and by Garth Brooks in 1998.
|-
| "Santa Tell Me"
| Ariana Grande
| 2014
| Co-written by Grande. First entered Billboard main Hot 100 chart at No. 65 on the week ending December 13, 2014, peaking at No. 12 on the week ending December 31, 2022 (following its third chart re-entry). Also made these other Billboard music charts (with peak positions shown): Adult Contemporary (No. 7), Adult Pop Airplay (No. 39), Digital Song Sales (No. 24), Global 200 (No. 5), Global 200 Excl. US (No. 6), Greatest of All Time Holiday 100 Songs (No. 19), Holiday 100 (No. 1), Holiday Airplay (No. 22), Holiday Digital Song Sales (No. 1), Holiday Streaming Songs (No. 1), Hot 100 Recurrents (No. 5), LyricFind Global (No. 4), LyricFind U.S. (No. 15), Pop Airplay (No. 39), Streaming Songs (No. 8), Top Triller Global (No. 11), and Top Triller U.S. (No. 3).
|-
| "Santa's a Fat Bitch"
| Insane Clown Posse
| 1997
| Only single ever charted by this group on the Billboard Hot 100.
|-
| "Santa's Coming for Us"
| Sia
| 2017
| Peaked at No. 1 for three consecutive weeks on Billboard Adult Contemporary chart (from mid December 2017 to early January 2018). Also made these other Billboard music charts (with peak positions shown): Adult Pop Airplay (No. 40), Global 200 (No. 109), Global 200 Excl. US (No. 115), Holiday 100 (No. 51), Holiday Digital Song Sales (No. 9), and Holiday Streaming Songs (No. 34). Included on Sia's 2017 holiday album, Everyday Is Christmas.
|-
| "Santa's Gonna Come in a Pickup Truck"
| Redneck Carollers
| 2000
| Originally recorded by Alan Jackson and Alvin & the Chipmunks in 1993. The song is a redneck style parody of "The Chipmunk Song".
|-
| "Santa's Got a Semi"
| Keith Harling
| 1999
| From the album Bring It On. Re-charted in 2000 from the various artists album A Christmas Collection.
|-
| "Santa's Little Helper Dingo"
| Dingo
| 1973
| Peaked at #11 on Billboard's Christmas Chart 12/22/1973.
|-
| "Save the Best for Last (Christmas version)"
| Vanessa L. Williams
| 1992
| Previously a No. 1 U.S. hit for 5 weeks as a non-holiday single, was reworked with a new snowy theme and wintry music video, popular on MTV for many years.
|-
| "Season of Love"
| 98 Degrees
| 2017
| Peaked at No. 18 on Billboard Adult Contemporary chart.
|-
| "The Secret of Christmas"
| Bing Crosby
| 1959
| Written by Sammy Cahn and Jimmy Van Heusen. Performed by Crosby in the 1959 film Say One for Me. Crosby re-recorded the song in 1964 for the album 12 Songs of Christmas. Other versions recorded by Ella Fitzgerald (1959), Johnny Mathis (1963), Julie Andrews (1982).
|-
| "Sending You a Little Christmas"
| Jim Brickman featuring Kristy Starling
| 2003
| Peaked at No. 1 on the Billboard Hot Adult Contemporary Tracks chart during the Christmas season of 2003.
|-
| "Shake Hands with Santa Claus"
| Louis Prima & His Orchestra
| 1951
|
|-
| "Shake Up Christmas"
| Train
| 2010
| Peaked at No. 12 on Billboard Hot Adult Contemporary Tracks chart.
|-
| rowspan=11|"Silent Night"
| 
| 1935
| Written on Christmas Eve 1818 in Germany by Franz Gruber under the title "Stille Nacht, heilige Nacht". First charted under the title "Silent Night, Hallowed Night" by The Haydn Quartet in 1905 peaking at #2.  Ernestine Schumann-Heink peaked at #6 with the origintal title in 1908.	In 1912, Elsie Baker peaked at #6 with "Silent Night, Hallowed Night".   The Neapolitan Trio charted in 1917 with "Silent Night, Holy Night" peaking at #6. Paul Whiteman and His Orchestra peaked at #6 in 1928 with "Silent Night, Holy Night (Melodies Pt 1)" featuring uncredited baritone vocals by Bing Crosby. 
Crosby's original hit version with the Victor Young Orchestra and backing vocals by the Guardsmen Quartet peaked at #7 on Billboard's popular singles chart. Crosby re-recorded the song in 1942 along with his new single, "White Christmas".  After these master recordings were worn out by Decca Records, Crosby re-recorded both in 1947 which are the versions featured now on his classic album Merry Christmas.
One of the most widely recorded Christmas songs, other charted versions were recorded by Mariah Carey (1994), Kenny Chesney (2004), MercyMe (2004), Peter Cetera (2005), Josh Groban (2007), 
|-
| 
|1948
|Peaked at #5 on Billboards R&B Chart.   
|-
| 
|1949
|Peaked at #6 on Billboards R&B Chart.   
|-
|
|1962
|Peaked at #5 on Billboard'''s Best Bets for Christmas as "Silent Night (Christmas Hymn)". 
|-
| 
|1966
|Peaked at #1 for 1 week under the title "Sleep in Heavenly Peace" on Billboards Best Bets for Christmas.  The same version appears on A Christmas Album that she released the following year.  
|-
| 
|1969
|The Temptations charted two versions of this song.  The first version from The Temptations Christmas Card peaked at #7 on Billboards Best Bets for Christmas.  Their version from 1980's Give Love at Christmas peaked at #9 on the Christmas Hits chart in 1985.  The song peaked at #27 on the Holiday 100 in 2014.  The 1980 version is the one typically heard on radio stations today.  
|-
|Mannheim Steamroller
|1984
| Titled "Stille Nacht" on their classic 1984 album, Christmas, the song charted at #23 on Billboards Holiday Songs chart in 2002.
|-
|Enya 
| 1988
| Recorded as "Oiche Chium", the single first charted in the U.S. peaking at No. 117 on Billboard Bubbling Under Hot 100 Singles chart in 1995. Also charted on Billboard Hot 100 Singles Sales chart in 2000, 2002, 2003 and 2004, peaking at No. 11. The classic 1818 Franz Gruber carol sung in Gaelic. Originally released as a B-side of Enya's 1988 single, "Evening Falls". Later released as the main track on a three-song EP in 1994, which was also the best-selling Christmas single in the U.S. for 10 years (1994–2004).
|-
|
|2000
| Featured on the various artist compilation Platinum Christmas under the title "Silent Night/Noche De Paz".  The song peaked at #8 on Billboards Holiday Songs chart in 2001.
|-
| Featuring Reba McEntire & Trisha Yearwood
|2011
|Peaked at #16 on Billboards Holiday 100 in 2014. 
|-
|Pentatonix
|2014
|Peaked at #21 on Billboards Holiday 100.
|-
| "Silver and Gold"
| Burl Ives
| 1964
| Written for the classic 1964 TV special, Rudolph, the Red-Nosed Reindeer.
|-
| "Silver Bells"
| Bing Crosby & Carole Richards
| 1950
| Written by Jay Livingston and Ray Evans, and later used in the 1951 film The Lemon Drop Kid starring Bob Hope. Other popular versions were also recorded by Johnny Mathis (1958), Doris Day (1964), Jo Stafford (1964), Al Martino (1964), The Supremes (1965), Kate Smith (1966), Earl Grant (1966), Kenny G (1994), Kimberley Locke (2003), Kenny Chesney (2004), Lady Antebellum (2011), and Whitney Wolanin (2014).
|-
| "Six Tons of Toys"
| Paul Brandt
| 1998
| New lyrics to Dave Dudley's 1963 hit "Six Days on the Road". Reached No. 66 on the Hot Country Singles chart in 1999.
|-
| rowspan=6|"Sleigh Ride"
| Arthur Fiedler and the Boston Pops
| 1949
| Original instrumental recording; debuted and peaked at No. 24 on the Billboard Best-Selling Pop Singles chart on the week ending December 16, 1949. Written in 1946, it was also recorded in 1950 by the song's composer, Leroy Anderson. A popular 1958 version by Johnny Mathis (backed by the Percy Faith Orchestra) was an early recording of the vocal version, with lyrics written by Mitchell Parrish.
|-
| The Ronettes
| 1963
| From the 1963 holiday album A Christmas Gift for You from Phil Spector. First entered Billboard Hot 100 chart at No. 41 on the week ending December 22, 2018, peaking at No. 10 on the week ending January 1, 2022 (following its third chart re-entry). Also made these other Billboard music charts (with peak positions shown): Global 200 (No. 13), Global 200 Excl. US (No. 28), Greatest of All Time Holiday 100 Songs (No. 13), Holiday 100 (No. 8), Holiday Airplay (No. 8), Holiday Digital Song Sales (No. 7), Holiday Streaming Songs (No. 6), Hot 100 Recurrents (No. 1), R&B Digital Song Sales (No. 19), R&B Streaming Songs (No. 1), R&B/Hip-Hop Digital Song Sales (No. 39), R&B/Hip-Hop Streaming Songs (No. 1), Radio Songs (No. 39), and Streaming Songs (No. 8).
|-
| Dolly Parton
| 1984
| Medley with "Winter Wonderland"; peaked at No. 6 on the Billboard Christmas Hits - Singles chart on the week ending December 22, 1984.
|-
| TLC
| 1992
| Peaked at No. 42 on the Billboard R&B Radio Monitor chart and at No. 43 on the Billboard Hot 100 Airplay chart on the week ending January 9, 1993. From the 1992 film Home Alone 2: Lost in New York and later included on the 1993 holiday compilation album, A LaFace Family Christmas.
|- 
| Lorrie Morgan
| 1993
| Peaked at No. 42 on the Billboard Hot Country Singles & Tracks chart on the week ending January 8, 2000.
|-
| Garth Brooks
| 1999
| Peaked at No. 54 on the Billboard Hot Country Singles & Tracks chart on the week ending January 8, 2000.
|-
| "Slipping Into Christmas"
| Leon Russell
| 1972
| B-side is "Christmas In Chicago".
|-
| "Snoopy's Christmas"
| The Royal Guardsmen
| 1967
| The third in a series of "Snoopy vs. The Red Baron" songs by the group. Reached No. 10 in Cashbox's pop chart, No. 1 in the Billboard Christmas chart. Re-charted in 1968 and 1969.
|-
| "Snow"
| Claudine Longet
| 1967
| The B-side of Longet's single "I Don't Intend to Spend Christmas Without You". Charted for two weeks on the Billboard Christmas chart.
|-
| "Snowbound for Christmas"
| The DeCastro Sisters
| 1955
| Arranged by Skip Martin. Also recorded by Jackie Gleason in 1967. B-side is "Christmas Is A-Comin'".
|-
| "Snowfall"
| Claude Thornhill and His Orchestra
| 1941
| Written by Claude Thornhill. Later recorded by Billy May, Tony Bennett, Henry Mancini, Doris Day and many others.
|-
| "Snow Flake"
| Jim Reeves
| 1966
| Charted on both the Hot Country Singles and Hot 100 charts.
|-
| "Snowflakes of Love"
| Toni Braxton
| 2001
| The lead single from Toni Braxton's Christmas album Snowflakes. Includes elements of Isaac Hayes' composition "Now We're One".
|-
| "Snowman"
| Sia
| 2017
| Peaked at No. 55 on Billboard Holiday 100 chart on the week ending December 31, 2022. Also made these other Billboard music charts (with peak positions shown): Digital Song Sales (No. 27), Global 200 (No. 15), Global 200 Excl. US (No. 9), Holiday Digital Song Sales (No. 3), LyricFind Global (No. 14), and LyricFind U.S. (No. 16). Included on Sia's 2017 holiday album, Everyday Is Christmas.
|-
| "SnowTime"
| James Taylor
| 2015
| Peaked at No. 19 on the Billboard Adult Contemporary chart.
|-
| rowspan=5|"Someday at Christmas"
| Stevie Wonder
| 1966
| Debuted and peaked at No. 24 on Billboard Best Selling Christmas Singles chart on the week ending December 17, 1966. Also made these other Billboard music charts (with peak positions shown): Adult R&B Airplay (No. 33), Global 200 (No. 157), Holiday 100 (No. 56), Holiday Airplay (No. 29), Holiday Digital Song Sales (No. 17), R&B Digital Song Sales (No. 11), and R&B/Hip-Hop Digital Song Sales (No. 16).
|-
| Mary J. Blige
| 1999
| Debuted and peaked at No. 87 on Billboard Hot R&B/Hip-Hop Singles & Tracks chart on the week ending January 8, 2000.
|-
| Jordan Hill
| 2012
| Peaked at No. 11 on Billboard Adult Contemporary chart on the week ending December 15, 2012.
|-
| Stevie Wonder and Andra Day
| 2015
| Debuted and peaked at No. 60 on Billboard Holiday 100 chart on the week ending December 19, 2015. Also made these other Billboard music charts (with peak positions shown): Adult R&B Airplay (No. 23), Holiday Digital Song Sales (No. 2), Hot R&B Songs (No. 24), LyricFind Global (No. 8), R&B Digital Song Sales (No. 5), and R&B/Hip-Hop Digital Song Sales (No. 12).
|-
| Lizzo
| 2022
| Peaked at No. 59 on Billboard Hot 100 chart on the week ending December 31, 2022. Also made these other Billboard music charts (with peak positions shown): Adult Contemporary (No. 18), Global 200 (No. 79), Global 200 Excl. US (No. 165), Holiday 100 (No. 39), Holiday Streaming Songs (No. 36), Hot R&B Songs (No. 9), Hot R&B/Hip-Hop Songs (No. 15), R&B Streaming Songs (No. 12), R&B/Hip-Hop Streaming Songs (No. 15), and Streaming Songs (No. 49).
|-
| "Someone Is Missing At Christmas"
| Anne Cochran
| 2005
| Peaked at No. 11 on the Hot Adult Contemporary Tracks.  From the album This is the Season.
|-
| "Song for a Winter's Night"
| Sarah McLachlan
| 1994
| Written and originally recorded in 1966 by Canadian singer/songwriter Gordon Lightfoot for his 1967 album The Way I Feel. McLachlan's version of the song was recorded in 1994 and first appeared on the soundtrack to that year's remake of Miracle on 34th Street. McLachlan also included her version on her 2006 holiday album Wintersong.
|-
| Songs Of Christmas
| 
| 1963
| This is the only EP to chart Billboard's Christmas singles chart, peaking at #9 on 12/14/1963. The EP contains the songs "Silver Bells", "White Christmas", "O Holy Night" and "The Christmas Song".
|-
| "The Sound of Christmas"
| Ramsey Lewis Trio
| 1961
|
|-
| "St. Brick Intro"
| Gucci Mane
| 2016
| Peaked at No. 29 on the Billboard Holiday 100
|-
| "The Star"
| Mariah Carey
| 2017
| Peaked at No. 6 on the Billboard Holiday Digital Song Sales chart in November 2017, and at No. 23 on the Billboard Adult Contemporary chart in early 2018.
|-
| "Step Into Christmas"
| Elton John
| 1973
| The B-side is another holiday tune by Elton titled "Ho Ho Ho (Who'd Be a Turkey at Christmas)". The British indie-rock band The Wedding Present recorded a cover of "Step Into Christmas" that appeared on the 1991 various artists holiday compilation A Lump of Coal.
|-
| "Suzy Snowflake"
| Rosemary Clooney
| 1951
| Written by Sid Tepper and Roy C. Bennett
|-
| "Sweet Little Baby Boy"
| James Brown
| 1966
| Released as a two-part single, it reached No. 8 on the Billboard Hot 100 in 1966. Also appeared in the Record World top 100 pop chart.
|-
| "A Swingin' Little Christmas"
| Jane Lynch featuring Kate Flannery & Tim Davis with The Tony Guerrero Quintet
| 2016
| Peaked at No. 10 on the Billboard Adult Contemporary chart in early 2018.
|-
| "Take Me Back to Toyland"
| Nat King Cole
| 1955
| Peaked at No. 47 on Billboard's Top 100 Popular Records chart in 1956. Featuring the Nelson Riddle Orchestra and Chorus.
|-
| "Take Me Home for Christmas"
| Dan + Shay
| 2020
| Peaked at No. 2 on Billboard Hot Country Songs chart on the week ending January 2, 2021. Also made these other Billboard music charts (with peak positions shown): Country Airplay (No. 37), Country Digital Song Sales (No. 4), Country Streaming Songs (No. 7), Digital Song Sales (No. 15), Holiday 100 (No. 25), Global 200 (No. 82), Holiday Digital Song Sales (No. 3), Holiday Streaming Songs (No. 26), Hot 100 (No. 48), and Streaming Songs (No. 29).
|-
| "Tennessee Christmas"
| Amy Grant
| 1983
| Covered by Alabama in 1985, Steve Wariner in 1990, among other country and Contemporary Christian artists.
|-
| "Thank God for Kids"
| Oak Ridge Boys
| 1982
| Peaked at No. 3 for two weeks on Billboard Hot Country Singles chart in early 1983. A 2003 version by Kenny Chesney peaked at No. 60 on Billboard Hot Country Singles & Tracks chart in early 2004.
|-
| "Thank God It's Christmas"
| Queen
| 1984
|
|-
| "Thanks for Christmas"
| XTC
| 1983
|
|-
| "That Holiday Feeling"
| Steve and Eydie
| 1964
| A 1998 cover by Michael Civisca and Mary Stahl was a regional hit in the Buffalo, New York area.
|-
| "That's Christmas to Me"
| Pentatonix
| 2014
| Peaked at No. 3 on Billboard Adult Contemporary chart.
|-
| "That's What I Want for Christmas"
| Nancy Wilson
| 1963
| Peaked at No. 6 on Billboard Christmas Singles chart. Charted again in 1964. Featuring orchestra by O.B. Masingill.  The flip side is her version of "What Are You Doing New Year's Eve" that peaked at # 17 in 1963. 
|-
| "There Is No Christmas Like a Home Christmas"
| Perry Como
| 1968
| Originally recorded by Como in 1950. Re-recorded version peaked at No. 28 on Billboard Christmas Singles chart in 1968. Featuring orchestration by Nick Perito and the Ray Charles Singers on backing vocals.
|-
| "There Won't Be Any Snow (Christmas in the Jungle)"
| Derrik Roberts
| 1965
| Peaked at No. 8 on Billboard Christmas Singles chart in 1965, and at No. 105 on Billboard Bubbling Under Hot 100 Singles chart in 1966. Included on the 1998 Westside Records compilation, Christmas Past.
|-
| rowspan=3|"(There's No Place Like) Home for the Holidays"
| Perry Como
| 1954
| Featuring accompaniment by the Mitchell Ayres Orchestra and the Ray Charles Singers. Peaked at No. 8 on the Billboard Most Played by Jockeys chart on the week ending December 29, 1954, and at No. 18 on the Billboard Best Sellers in Stores chart one week earlier. A second recording of the song by Como with the same backing accompaniment as the 1954 original was released in 1959. First entered the Billboard Hot 100 chart on the week ending December 29, 2018, peaking at No. 22 on the week ending January 2, 2021, following its second chart re-entry. Also made these other Billboard music charts (with peak positions shown): Global 200 (No. 61), Holiday 100 (No. 13), Holiday Airplay (No. 14), Holiday Digital Song Sales (No. 50), Holiday Streaming Songs (No. 10), Hot 100 Recurrents (No. 8), and Streaming Songs (No. 18).
|-
| Garth Brooks
| 1999
| Peaked at No. 63 on the Billboard Hot Country Singles & Tracks chart on the week ending January 8, 2000.
|-
| Cyndi Lauper & Norah Jones 
| 2011
| Peaked at No. 11 on the Billboard Adult Contemporary chart on the week ending January 7, 2012.
|-
| "Thirty-Two Feet – Eight Little Tails"
| Gene Autry
| 1951
| Peaked at No. 5 on Billboard Best Selling Children's Records chart. Featuring orchestration by Carl Cotner.
|-
| rowspan=4|"This Christmas" (1)
| Donny Hathaway
| 1970
| Peaked at No. 11 on Billboard Christmas Singles chart on the week ending December 23, 1972. First entered Billboard main Hot 100 chart at No. 39 on the week ending January 2, 2021, peaking at No. 37 on the week ending January 7, 2023 (one week following its chart re-entry). Also made these other Billboard music charts (with peak positions shown): Global 200 (No. 62), Greatest of All Time Holiday 100 Songs (No. 49), Holiday 100 (No. 25), Holiday Digital Song Sales (No. 32), Holiday Streaming Songs (No. 27), Hot 100 Recurrents (No. 10), R&B Digital Song Sales (No. 10), R&B Streaming Songs (No. 6), R&B/Hip-Hop Digital Song Sales (No. 23), R&B/Hip-Hop Streaming Songs (No. 6), and Streaming Songs (No. 27).
|-
| Richard Kincaid featuring Cuba Gooding, Sr.
| 2012
| Peaked at No. 9 on Billboard Adult Contemporary chart on the week ending December 15, 2012.
|-
| Seal
| 2015
| Peaked at No. 1 on Billboard Adult Contemporary chart on the week ending January 2, 2016.
|-
| Train
| 2016
| Spent two nonconsecutive weeks at No. 1 on Billboard Adult Contemporary chart in December 2016.
|-
| "This Christmas" (2)
| Matthew and Gunnar Nelson featuring Alyssa Bonagura
| 2015
| Peaked at No. 17 on the Billboard Adult Contemporary chart.
|-
| "This Gift"
| 98°
| 1999
| Peaked at No. 49 on the Billboard Hot 100 singles chart and at No. 6 on Billboard Adult Contemporary chart in early 2000.
|-
| "This Is Your Gift"
| John Tesh
| 2002
| Peaked at No. 19 on Billboard Adult Contemporary chart. From the album Christmas Worship.
|-
| "This One's for the Children"
| New Kids on the Block
| 1989
| Peaked at No. 7 on the Billboard Hot 100 singles chart, No. 27 on Billboard Adult Contemporary chart and No. 55 on Billboard Hot Black Singles chart in 1990. The single also included "Funky, Funky Xmas," from the group's holiday album Merry, Merry Christmas, as a second track.
|-
| "This Time of the Year"
| Brook Benton
| 1959
| Peaked at No. 66 on the Billboard Hot 100 singles chart in 1959, and No. 12 on Billboard Hot R&B Sides chart in 1960. Featuring orchestration by Belford Hendricks. Another version by Brenda Lee charted in 1964, peaking at No. 12 on Billboard Christmas Singles chart.
|-
| "'Til Santa's Gone (Milk and Cookies)"
| Clint Black
| 1995
| Peaked at No. 58 on Billboard Hot Country Singles & Tracks in 1996. Originally released in 1990 as a single, and on the albums Home for the Holidays and A Season of Harmony with the title "Til' Santa's Gone (I Just Can't Wait)".
|-
| "Time Passages"
| Al Stewart
| 1978
| The most popular song on the Billboard Adult Contemporary Charts in 1978 and 1979. Though released in December 1978 with a theme of going home for Christmas, the song has largely lost its association with Christmas over the years and is now aired more often in general recurrent rotation (in classic hits formats) than in Christmas rotations.
|-
| "Toyland"
| Doris Day
| 1964
| From The Doris Day Christmas Album. Based on the Victor Herbert operetta Babes in Toyland. Also popular as an instrumental by countless artists.
|-
| "Trains and Winter Rains"
| Enya
| 2008
| Peaked at No. 27 on Billboard Adult Contemporary chart. Included on Enya's 2008 album, And Winter Came....
|-
| "'Twas the Night After Christmas"
| Jeff Foxworthy
| 1996
| Peaked at No. 67 on Billboard Hot Country Singles & Tracks chart in 1997. Parody of the famous 1823 poem written by Clement Moore.
|-
| "'Twas the Night Before Christmas (A Visit from St. Nicholas)"
| Fred Waring and His Pennsylvanians
| 1942
| A recording of Clement Moore's famous 1823 poem set to music by Ken Darby and orchestration by Harry Simeone, it first charted on Billboard Best Selling Children's Records chart in 1949, peaking at No. 11, and again in 1952, peaking at No. 6. This first recording by Waring was released around Christmastime of 1942 on the 4-record album set, 'Twas The Night Before Christmas. He went on to record it two more times; again for Decca Records in 1955, and a third and final time for Capitol Records in stereo in 1963. This 1963 recording became the most famous of the poem's musical adaptations. The song also charted by Arthur Godfrey with backing orchestration by Archie Bleyer on Billboard's Best Selling Children's Records chart in 1950.
|-
| "The Twelve Days of Christmas"
| Mitch Miller and the Gang
| 1961
| One of the most recorded songs each year. First known recorded version was by Bing Crosby and The Andrews Sisters in 1949. The comedy duo of Bob & Doug McKenzie recorded a parody of this song in 1981. Other popular parodies that still receive airplay on radio stations around the holiday season include "The Twelve Pains of Christmas" by the Bob Rivers Comedy Corp (1987), and "Redneck 12 Days of Christmas" by Jeff Foxworthy (1995). During the Christmas season of 2008, a comical a cappella version by Straight No Chaser reached No. 5 on Billboard Adult Contemporary chart.
|-
| "The Twelve Gifts of Christmas"
| Allan Sherman
| 1963
| Peaked at No. 5 on Billboard Christmas Singles chart. Comical parody version of the traditional English carol, "The Twelve Days of Christmas".
|-
| "25th of Last December"
| Roberta Flack
| 1977
| Peaked at No. 28 on Billboard Easy Listening chart and No. 52 on Billboard Hot Soul Singles chart in 1978. Written by Gene McDaniels. Originally recorded for the 1977 album Blue Lights in the Basement. Flack re-recorded the song for her 1997 holiday album, The Christmas Album.
|-
| "2000 Miles"
| The Pretenders
| 1983
| Originally released as the B-side of the band's 1983 single "Middle of the Road", and then included on the band's 1984 album Learning to Crawl. Also covered by Holly Cole in 1989, and recorded by Coldplay in 2003 as a download single for charity.
|-
| "Twinkle Twinkle Little Me"
| The Supremes
| 1965
| Peaked at No. 5 on Billboard Christmas Singles chart. Charted again in 1966 and 1967.
|-
| "Twistin' Bells"
| Santo & Johnny
| 1960
| Peaked at No. 49 on the Billboard Hot 100 singles chart. "Twist-rock" version of "Jingle Bells".
|-
| "Under The Mistletoe"
|  & Brett Eldredge
| 2020
| Peaked at No. 34 on Billboards Holiday 100 in 2020.
|-
| "Underneath the Tree"
| Kelly Clarkson
| 2013
| Written by Clarkson and Greg Kurstin. Spent four consecutive weeks at No. 1 on Billboard Adult Contemporary chart (from the week ending December 14, 2013, to the week ending January 4, 2014). First entered Billboard main Hot 100 chart at No. 92 on the week ending December 21, 2013, peaking at No. 12 on the week ending January 2, 2021 (following its third chart re-entry). Also made these other Billboard music charts (with peak positions shown): Digital Song Sales (No. 17), Global 200 (No. 8), Global 200 Excl. US (No. 14), Greatest of All Time Holiday 100 Songs (No. 22), Holiday 100 (No. 8), Holiday Airplay (No. 24), Holiday Digital Song Sales (No. 3), Holiday Streaming Songs (No. 8), Hot 100 Recurrents (No. 3), LyricFind Global (No. 12), and Streaming Songs (No. 9).
|-
| "Up on the House Top"
| Kimberley Locke
| 2005
| Spent four weeks at No. 1 on Billboard's Adult Contemporary chart in December 2005 and early 2006. First released by Gene Autry and the Cass County Boys in 1953, and re-recorded by Autry for his 1957 holiday album, Rudolph, the Red-Nosed Reindeer & other Christmas Favorites.
|-
| "Warm & Fuzzy"
| Billy Gilman
| 2000
| Peaked at No. 50 on Billboard's Hot Country Singles & Tracks chart in 2001.
|-
| rowspan=3|"We Need a Little Christmas"
| Percy Faith, His Orchestra & Chorus
| 1966
| Peaked at No. 24 on Billboard Holiday Airplay chart (week ending December 10, 2005) and at No. 73 on Billboard Holiday 100 chart (week ending December 13, 2014). Originally from the Broadway musical production Mame.
|-
| Kimberley Locke
| 2008
| Peaked at No. 19 on Billboard Adult Contemporary chart on the week ending January 3, 2009.
|-
| Glee Cast
| 2010
| Peaked at No. 15 on Billboard Adult Contemporary chart (week ending December 25, 2010) and at No. 16 on Billboard Holiday Digital Songs Sales chart (week ending December 4, 2010).
|-
| "We Three Kings (Star of Wonder)"
| BlackHawk
| 1997
| Peaked at No. 75 on Billboard Hot Country Singles & Tracks chart in 1998. Composed by John Henry Hopkins in 1857.
|-
| "We Wish You a Merry Christmas"
| Kenny G
| 2005
| Peaked at No. 15 on Billboard Adult Contemporary. Recorded by dozens of artists over the years, but Kenny G's 2005 recording was the first version to make any of Billboard music charts.
|-
| "Welcome Christmas"
| The Who Village Choir
| 1966
| Written for the 1966 Dr. Seuss TV classic How the Grinch Stole Christmas!.
|-
| "What Are You Doing New Year's Eve?"
| The Orioles
| 1949
| Peaked at No. 9 on Billboard Best-Selling Retail Rhythm & Blues chart. Written by Frank Loesser. First recorded by Margaret Whiting in 1947. Other charted versions include Danté & The Evergreens (1960), and Nancy Wilson (1965). Recorded by many other artists, including Dick Haymes & the Les Paul Trio (1947), Ella Fitzgerald (1960), Ramsey Lewis Trio (1960), King Curtis (1968), Johnny Mathis (1969), Patti LaBelle (1990), The Stylistics (1992), Harry Connick, Jr. (1993), Barbra Streisand (2001) and Diana Krall (2005).
|-
| "What Can You Get a Wookiee for Christmas (When He Already Owns a Comb?)"
| The Star Wars Intergalactic Droid Choir & Chorale
| 1980
| Peaked at No. 69 on the Billboard Hot 100 singles chart. A novelty record featuring Star Wars''' Chewbacca and included on the 1980 holiday album, Christmas in the Stars. The artist is actually disco producer Meco Monardo.
|-
| "What Child Is This?"
| Mark Chesnutt
| 1996
| Peaked at No. 75 on Billboard Hot Country Singles & Tracks chart in 1997. Included on the 1996 various artists album A Country Christmas. Traditional 16th century English melody, known as "Greensleeves". Lyrics written in the 19th century by William Chatterton Dix. Also charted by Carrie Underwood (2009).
|-
| "What Christmas Means to Me"
| Stevie Wonder
| 1967
| From the album Someday at Christmas. Later versions were recorded by Paul Young (1992), Hanson (1997), Al Green (2004), and Jessica Simpson (2004).  In 2021, John Legend released a duet with Stevie Wonder that charted at #34 on the Holiday 100.
|-
| "What Does Christmas Mean?"
| Louis York featuring The Shindellas
| 2017
| Peaked at No. 30 on the Billboard Adult Contemporary chart in 2018.
|-
| "What Will Santa Claus Say (When He Finds Everybody Swingin'?)"
| Louis Prima and his New Orleans Gang
| 1936
|
|-
| "What Will the New Year Bring?"
| Donna Fargo
| 1975
| Peaked at No. 58 on Billboard Hot Country Singles chart in 1976.
|-
| "Whatever Happened To Christmas?"
| Frank Sinatra
| 1968
| Peaked at No. 7 on Billboard Christmas Singles chart 12/14/1968. Written by Jimmy Webb, and featuring the Don Costa Orchestra. Covered by Aimee Mann in 2006.
|-
| "When a Child Is Born"
| Michael Holm
| 1974
| Peaked at No. 7 on Billboard Easy Listening chart and No. 53 on the Billboard Hot 100 singles chart in 1975. Covered in 1976 by Johnny Mathis, whose version spent three weeks at No. 1 on the Official UK Singles Chart in late December 1976 and early 1977. The melody was originally written as "Soleado" in 1972.
|-
| "When Winter Comes"
| Artie Shaw & his Orchestra
| 1939
| Peaked at No. 6 on the pop singles chart in mid-1939. Featuring vocals by Tony Pastor. From the 1939 film Second Fiddle.
|-
| "Where Are You Christmas?"
| Faith Hill
| 2000
| Peaked at No. 10 Billboard Adult Contemporary chart, No. 26 on Billboard Hot Country Singles & Tracks chart and No. 65 on the Billboard Hot 100 singles chart in 2001. From the 2000 live action film, How the Grinch Stole Christmas. Originally written for and intended to be sung by Mariah Carey, but she was not able due to record label disputes.
|-
| rowspan=8| "White Christmas"
| 
| 1942
| Spent eleven weeks at No. 1 on Billboard National Best Selling Retail Records chart and three weeks at No. 1 on Billboard Harlem Hit Parade chart in late 1942. Written by Irving Berlin. Bing Crosby's original 1942 version featured the Ken Darby Singers and John Scott Trotter's Orchestra. The song debuted in the 1942 film Holiday Inn (sung by Crosby), then appeared in the 1954 color film titled after the song. The original was re-recorded in 1947 and it is still the best-selling Christmas single of all time in the U.S. (estimated at more than 50 million sold through the years), and appears on numerous holiday albums as well. Other charting recordings in 1942 were made by Gordon Jenkins (#16), Charlie Spivak (#20) and Freddy Martin (#20).   Spivak and Martin recharted in 1945 both peaking at #16. Crosby made #1 again in 1945 and 1947 with his single.  Elvis Presley's 1957 cover of the song garnered controversy when Irving Berlin called for his version to be banned from radio airplay. 
|-
| 
| 1944
| Charted #7 on Billboards popular singles chart.  
|-
| 
| 1946
| Peaked at #9 on Billboard's popular singles chart. Eddy Howard and his Orchestra also charted the title that year peaking at #21.  
|-
| 
| 1949
| The flip side of his "Blue Christmas" single peaked at No. 7 on Billboard's Country & Western Records chart. A version by The Ravens peaked at No. 9 on Billboard's Rhythm & Blues Records chart in January 1949 on National Records. 
|-
| 
| 1954
| Peaked at #2 on Billboard's R&B singles chart. 
|-
| 
| 1963
| Peaked at #1 on Billboard's Christmas Records chart for 5 weeks.
|-
| 
| 1968
| Peaked at #12 on Billboard's Best Bets For Christmas single chart.  The flip side to his popular "Merry Christmas Baby" single. 
|-
|  Duet With Shania Twain
| 2011
| Charted for 26 weeks peaking at #22 in 2015 on Billboard's Holiday 100.
|-
| "White Is in the Winter Night"
| Enya
| 2008
| Peaked at No. 8 on Billboard Adult Contemporary chart. Included on Enya's 2008 album, And Winter Came....
|-
| "White Winter Hymnal"
| Pentatonix
| 2014
| From their album That's Christmas to Me.  It charted for 15 weeks peaking at #39 in 2015 on the Holiday 100.
|-
| "The White World of Winter"
| Bing Crosby
| 1965
| Peaked at No. 20 on the Billboard Christmas Singles chart. Written by Hoagy Carmichael and Mitchell Parish, and recorded with the Sonny Burke Orchestra.
|-
| "Who Took the Merry Out of Christmas"
| The Staple Singers
| 1970
| Peaked at No. 2 on Billboard's Christmas Singles chart in 1973.
|-
| "Why Couldn't It Be Christmas Every Day?"
| Bianca Ryan
| 2006
| Though not officially released as a single by Columbia Records, radio stations in several countries played the song in 2006 as part of their Christmas-themed programming.
|-
| "Will Santy Come to Shanty Town"
| Eddy Arnold, the Tennessee Plowboy and his Guitar
| 1949
| Peaked at No. 5 on Billboard Country & Western Records Most Played By Folk Disk Jockeys chart. Written by Eddy Arnold, Steve Nelson and his younger brother Ed Nelson, Jr.
|-
| "Winter"
| Spike Jones and his City Slickers
| 1952
| Peaked at No. 23 on the pop singles chart in early 1953. Featuring the Mello Men on vocals. B-side to Jones's hit recording of "I Saw Mommy Kissing Santa Claus".
|-
| "Winter Weather"
| Benny Goodman
| 1941
| Peaked at No. 24 on the pop singles chart in 1942. Featuring Peggy Lee and Art Lund on vocals. Also recorded in 1941 by Fats Waller. Later recordings include Jo Stafford (1955) and Tony Bennett (1968).
|-
| rowspan=10| "Winter Wonderland"
|  and His Royal Canadians
| 1934
| Lombardo's version peaked at No. 2 on the pop singles chart in early 1935, while a version by Ted Weems and his Orchestra peaked at No. 13 on the pop singles chart. Written in 1934 by Felix Bernard (composer) and Richard B. Smith (lyricist). Covered by hundreds of artists. Other charted hit versions include The Andrews Sisters with Guy Lombardo (1946), Pat Green (2003), and Newsboys (2010).  Dolly Parton released the medley "Sleigh Ride/Winter Wonderland" that reached #6 on Billboard's Christmas Hits singles chart in 1984.  In 2014, Pentatonix released the medley "Winter Wonderland/Don't Worry Be Happy" featuring Tori Kelly from the album That's Christmas to Me that peaked at #31 on the Holiday 100
|-
|  and the Satisfiers
| 1946
| Peaked at #10 on Billboard's Popular Music charts.   
|-
|  and the Pied Pipers
| 1946
| Peaked at #6 on Billboard's Popular Music charts in 1947.   
|-
|  With Percy Faith & His Orchestra
| 1958
| Featured on the his best-selling 1958 album Merry Christmas, the song peaked at #38 on Billboard's Holiday 100 chart in 2012.
|-
|   
| 1960
| Later featured on their 1961 album Sound of Christmas, the single peaked at #23 on Billboard's Best Bets For Christmas in 1966.  
|-
|  
| 1963
| Featured on the classic album, A Christmas Gift for You from Phil Spector.  The song peaked at #33 on Billboard's Holiday 100 chart in 2022.
|-
| Air Supply 
| 1987
| From Air Supply's The Christmas Album. The song peaked at #11 on Billboard's Holiday Songs chart in 2005.
|-
| Eurythmics 
| 1987
| Featured on the classic various artists album A Very Special Christmas, the song peaked at #11 on Billboard's Holiday Songs chart in 2007.  
|-
|  
| 1992
| From her Home for Christmas album, the song peaked at #7 on Billboard's Holiday Songs chart in 2002.
|-
| Lonestar 
| 2000
| Peaked at #24 on Billboard's Holiday Songs chart in 2002.  
|-
| "Winter World of Love"
| Engelbert Humperdinck
| 1969
| Charted on both the Adult Contemporary and Billboard Hot 100 charts in 1969.
|-
| "Wistful Willie"
| Jimmie Rodgers
| 1959
| Peaked at No. 112 on Billboard Bubbling Under Hot 100 Singles chart. Featuring the Joe Reisman Orchestra. The flipside, "It's Christmas Once Again" reached the "Beat Of The Week – Singles Coming Up" survey in Music Vendor.
|-
| "Wizards in Winter"
| Trans-Siberian Orchestra
| 2004
| Peaked at No. 18 on Billboard Hot Adult Contemporary Tracks chart in 2005. Taken from the group's third holiday album, The Lost Christmas Eve.
|-
| "Wonderful Christmastime"
| Paul McCartney
| 1979
| Written and produced by McCartney. The single's B-side, "Rudolph the Red-Nosed Reggae," is an instrumental cover of "Rudolph the Red-Nosed Reindeer." Debuted on Cash Box Top 100 Singles chart on the week ending December 29, 1979, peaking at No. 83 two weeks later. First entered Billboard main Hot 100 chart at No. 47 on the week ending December 29, 2018, peaking at No. 28 on the week ending January 2, 2021 (two weeks following its first chart re-entry). Also made these other Billboard music charts (with peak positions shown): Adult Contemporary (No. 29), Adult Pop Airplay (No. 32), Christmas Singles (No. 10), Global 200 (No. 18), Global 200 Excl. US (No. 25), Greatest of All Time Holiday 100 Songs (No. 20), Holiday 100 (No. 15), Holiday Airplay (No. 8), Holiday Digital Song Sales (No. 17), Holiday Streaming Songs (No. 13), Hot 100 Recurrents (No. 1), LyricFind U.S. (No. 12), Radio Songs (No. 48), Rock Digital Song Sales (No. 7), Rock Streaming Songs (No. 2), and Streaming Songs (No. 23).
|-
| "The Working Elf Blues"
| Daron Norwood
| 1994
| Peaked at No. 75 on Billboard Hot Country Singles & Tracks chart in early 1995. Parody of Merle Haggard's "Workin' Man Blues".
|-
| "Wrapped in Red"
| Kelly Clarkson
| 2013
|Peaked at No. 2 on Billboard Adult Contemporary chart in 2014. First released on Clarkson's 2013 holiday album of the same name.
|-
| "Yes, Patricia, There Is a Santa Claus"
| Jimmy Dean
| 1964
| Peaked at No. 14 on Billboard's Christmas Singles chart in 1965. Inspired by the famous 1897 newspaper editorial, "Yes, Virginia, there is a Santa Claus". A version by José Ferrer had previously reached the Australian pop chart in 1961.
|-
| "Yingle Bells"
| Yogi Yorgesson
| 1949
| Peaked at No. 7 on Billboard Best-Selling Pop Singles chart. Instrumental backing by the Johnny Duffy Trio. Parody of "Jingle Bells".
|-
| "You Make It Feel Like Christmas" (1)
| Neil Diamond
| 1984
| Peaked at No. 28 on Billboard Adult Contemporary chart in 1985. Originally appeared on Diamond's 1984 album Primitive, but later re-recorded and included on his 1992 holiday release, The Christmas Album.
|-
| "You Make It Feel Like Christmas" (2)
| Gwen Stefani featuring Blake Shelton
| 2017
| Peaked at No. 9 on the Billboard Adult Contemporary chart in early 2018, at No. 37 on the Billboard Holiday 100 chart, and at No. 3 on the Billboard Holiday Digital Song Sales chart.
|-
| rowspan=2|"You're a Mean One, Mr. Grinch"
| Thurl Ravenscroft
| 1966
| From the 1966 Dr. Seuss holiday TV special How the Grinch Stole Christmas! First entered Billboard main Hot 100 chart at No. 49 on the week ending January 4, 2020, peaking at No. 31 on the week ending December 31, 2022 (upon its fourth chart re-entry). Also made these other Billboard music charts (with peak positions shown): Country Digital Song Sales (No. 23), Digital Song Sales (No. 33), Global 200 (No. 88), Holiday 100 (No. 14), Holiday Airplay (No. 14), Holiday Digital Song Sales (No. 2), Holiday Streaming Songs (No. 8), Hot 100 Recurrents (No. 3), Radio Songs (No. 49), and Streaming Songs (No. 25).
|-
| Whirling Dervishes
| 1992
| Peaked at No. 120 on the Billboard Bubbling Under Hot 100 chart on the week ending January 7, 1995.
|-
| "You're All I Want for Christmas" (1)
| Frankie Laine
| 1948
| Peaked at No. 11 on Billboard Best-Selling Pop Singles chart in 1948 and No. 15 on Billboard Race Records chart in 1949. Written by Seger Ellis and Glen Moore. Also charted by Frank Gallagher in 1948. Other versions recorded by Bing Crosby (1949), Eddie Fisher (1952), Al Martino (1964), Jackie Gleason (1967), and the Salsoul Orchestra (1981).
|-
| "You're All I Want for Christmas" (2)
| Brook Benton
| 1963
| Peaked at No. 3 on Billboard Christmas Singles chart. Charted again in 1964. Featuring orchestration by Luchi DeJesus. Different song than the same-titled hit by Frankie Laine from 1948. It was recorded in 1964 by Don Patterson for his album Holiday Soul. In 2011 Dutch singer Caro Emerald recorded a version, sampling Benton's original recording to produce a duet.
|-
| "'Zat You, Santa Claus?"
| Garth Brooks
| 2002
| Peaked at No. 56 on Billboard's Hot Country Singles & Tracks chart in 2003. Written by Jack Fox. Originally recorded by Louis Armstrong with the Commanders in 1953. Another popular version was released by Buster Poindexter in 1987.
|}

Parodies
 Radio personality Bob Rivers has written countless Christmas parodies. Some of the most notable include "The Twelve Pains of Christmas" and "The Restroom Door Said Gentlemen". He has also written some original humorous holiday songs, including "The Chimney Song". These have appeared on, as of 2006, five albums: Twisted Christmas, I Am Santa Claus, More Twisted Christmas, Chipmunks Roasting on an Open Fire and Christmas.
 Da Yoopers released "Rusty Chevrolet" in 1986, with lyrics written by Jim DeCaire & Joe Potila used with the song "Jingle Bells".
 The comedy duo of Stan Boreson and Doug Setterberg reached No. 10 on the Billboard Christmas charts in 1970 with "Christmas Goose (Snowbird)", a parody of Anne Murray's "Snowbird".
 Homer and Jethro parodied the song "All I Want for Christmas Is My Two Front Teeth" as "All I Want for Christmas Is My Upper Plate", on their 1968 album Cool Crazy Christmas. 
 The US TV series South Park aired an early Christmas episode (and namesake song), "Mr. Hankey the Christmas Poo" in 1997. This led to annual Christmas episodes, many including brand new songs or parodies of traditional tunes. An all-music sing-along Christmas 'special' was hosted by Mr. Hankey and a full-length album of the 'new Christmas classics' from the series was released, along with videos for all the songs.
 The political satire group The Capitol Steps has released four Christmas albums: Danny's First Noel (1989), All I Want for Christmas Is a Tax Increase (1993),O, Christmas Bush (2006), and Barackin' Around the Christmas Tree (2009). In addition, some of their other albums contain parodies of Christmas songs. The group's first performance in 1981, was a Christmas show.
 Many Christmas songs were parodied by the Floridian band, The Monsters in the Morning; they were included on the second disc of the Monsters Double Brown album.

See also

 Best-selling Christmas/holiday singles in the United States
 Best-selling Christmas/holiday albums in the United States
 Billboard Christmas Holiday Charts
 Christmas music
 List of Christmas carols
 List of Christmas hit singles in the United Kingdom

Notes
 The Billboard Book of Number 1 Hits by Fred Bronson
 Billboard's Book of Top 40 Hits: 1955–2003 by Joel Whitburn
 Billboard's Top Pop Singles 1955–2002 by Joel Whitburn
 Hit Singles: Top 20 Charts from 1954 to the Present Day by Dave McAleer
 Christmas in the Charts 1920–2004'' by Joel Whitburn. Record Research Inc. (2004)

References

Bibliography

 
Singles,United States